

328001–328100 

|-bgcolor=#d6d6d6
| 328001 ||  || — || April 16, 2007 || Mount Lemmon || Mount Lemmon Survey || — || align=right | 3.4 km || 
|-id=002 bgcolor=#d6d6d6
| 328002 ||  || — || April 19, 2007 || Great Shefford || P. Birtwhistle || EOS || align=right | 2.9 km || 
|-id=003 bgcolor=#fefefe
| 328003 ||  || — || November 3, 2003 || Apache Point || SDSS || H || align=right data-sort-value="0.80" | 800 m || 
|-id=004 bgcolor=#d6d6d6
| 328004 ||  || — || April 18, 2007 || Kitt Peak || Spacewatch || — || align=right | 2.4 km || 
|-id=005 bgcolor=#d6d6d6
| 328005 ||  || — || April 19, 2007 || Kitt Peak || Spacewatch || — || align=right | 2.3 km || 
|-id=006 bgcolor=#d6d6d6
| 328006 ||  || — || April 20, 2007 || Kitt Peak || Spacewatch || — || align=right | 2.9 km || 
|-id=007 bgcolor=#d6d6d6
| 328007 ||  || — || April 20, 2007 || Kitt Peak || Spacewatch || — || align=right | 3.2 km || 
|-id=008 bgcolor=#d6d6d6
| 328008 ||  || — || April 18, 2007 || Kitt Peak || Spacewatch || EUP || align=right | 6.6 km || 
|-id=009 bgcolor=#d6d6d6
| 328009 ||  || — || April 22, 2007 || Mount Lemmon || Mount Lemmon Survey || — || align=right | 3.2 km || 
|-id=010 bgcolor=#d6d6d6
| 328010 ||  || — || April 22, 2007 || Mount Lemmon || Mount Lemmon Survey || EOS || align=right | 2.0 km || 
|-id=011 bgcolor=#d6d6d6
| 328011 ||  || — || April 22, 2007 || Mount Lemmon || Mount Lemmon Survey || JLI || align=right | 2.5 km || 
|-id=012 bgcolor=#d6d6d6
| 328012 ||  || — || April 23, 2007 || Kitt Peak || Spacewatch || — || align=right | 2.6 km || 
|-id=013 bgcolor=#fefefe
| 328013 ||  || — || April 24, 2007 || Mount Lemmon || Mount Lemmon Survey || H || align=right data-sort-value="0.84" | 840 m || 
|-id=014 bgcolor=#d6d6d6
| 328014 ||  || — || April 22, 2007 || Kitt Peak || Spacewatch || EOS || align=right | 2.4 km || 
|-id=015 bgcolor=#d6d6d6
| 328015 ||  || — || April 18, 2007 || Kitt Peak || Spacewatch || — || align=right | 3.4 km || 
|-id=016 bgcolor=#d6d6d6
| 328016 ||  || — || April 25, 2007 || Mount Lemmon || Mount Lemmon Survey || — || align=right | 3.1 km || 
|-id=017 bgcolor=#d6d6d6
| 328017 ||  || — || May 7, 2007 || Mount Lemmon || Mount Lemmon Survey || — || align=right | 3.3 km || 
|-id=018 bgcolor=#d6d6d6
| 328018 ||  || — || May 9, 2007 || Mount Lemmon || Mount Lemmon Survey || EOS || align=right | 2.0 km || 
|-id=019 bgcolor=#d6d6d6
| 328019 ||  || — || May 9, 2007 || Mount Lemmon || Mount Lemmon Survey || — || align=right | 3.1 km || 
|-id=020 bgcolor=#d6d6d6
| 328020 ||  || — || May 7, 2007 || Kitt Peak || Spacewatch || — || align=right | 3.2 km || 
|-id=021 bgcolor=#d6d6d6
| 328021 ||  || — || January 7, 2006 || Mount Lemmon || Mount Lemmon Survey || — || align=right | 2.4 km || 
|-id=022 bgcolor=#d6d6d6
| 328022 ||  || — || May 7, 2007 || Kitt Peak || Spacewatch || — || align=right | 3.6 km || 
|-id=023 bgcolor=#d6d6d6
| 328023 ||  || — || May 10, 2007 || Mount Lemmon || Mount Lemmon Survey || — || align=right | 2.9 km || 
|-id=024 bgcolor=#d6d6d6
| 328024 ||  || — || May 9, 2007 || Kitt Peak || Spacewatch || — || align=right | 3.0 km || 
|-id=025 bgcolor=#d6d6d6
| 328025 ||  || — || May 7, 2007 || Mount Lemmon || Mount Lemmon Survey || — || align=right | 3.4 km || 
|-id=026 bgcolor=#d6d6d6
| 328026 ||  || — || May 9, 2007 || Kitt Peak || Spacewatch || — || align=right | 3.5 km || 
|-id=027 bgcolor=#d6d6d6
| 328027 ||  || — || May 21, 2007 || Tiki || S. F. Hönig, N. Teamo || — || align=right | 3.8 km || 
|-id=028 bgcolor=#d6d6d6
| 328028 ||  || — || May 24, 2007 || Mount Lemmon || Mount Lemmon Survey || — || align=right | 2.6 km || 
|-id=029 bgcolor=#d6d6d6
| 328029 ||  || — || May 25, 2007 || Mount Lemmon || Mount Lemmon Survey || — || align=right | 3.2 km || 
|-id=030 bgcolor=#fefefe
| 328030 ||  || — || May 17, 2007 || Catalina || CSS || H || align=right data-sort-value="0.98" | 980 m || 
|-id=031 bgcolor=#d6d6d6
| 328031 ||  || — || January 13, 2005 || Kitt Peak || Spacewatch || — || align=right | 4.5 km || 
|-id=032 bgcolor=#d6d6d6
| 328032 ||  || — || June 7, 2007 || Kitt Peak || Spacewatch || — || align=right | 3.6 km || 
|-id=033 bgcolor=#d6d6d6
| 328033 ||  || — || June 7, 2007 || Kitt Peak || Spacewatch || MEL || align=right | 4.0 km || 
|-id=034 bgcolor=#d6d6d6
| 328034 ||  || — || June 8, 2007 || Kitt Peak || Spacewatch || — || align=right | 3.9 km || 
|-id=035 bgcolor=#d6d6d6
| 328035 ||  || — || June 8, 2007 || Kitt Peak || Spacewatch || — || align=right | 4.6 km || 
|-id=036 bgcolor=#d6d6d6
| 328036 ||  || — || June 8, 2007 || Kitt Peak || Spacewatch || — || align=right | 3.5 km || 
|-id=037 bgcolor=#d6d6d6
| 328037 ||  || — || June 8, 2007 || Kitt Peak || Spacewatch || — || align=right | 3.0 km || 
|-id=038 bgcolor=#d6d6d6
| 328038 ||  || — || October 14, 1998 || Kitt Peak || Spacewatch || — || align=right | 3.4 km || 
|-id=039 bgcolor=#d6d6d6
| 328039 ||  || — || June 10, 2007 || Kitt Peak || Spacewatch || — || align=right | 3.1 km || 
|-id=040 bgcolor=#d6d6d6
| 328040 ||  || — || June 10, 2007 || Kitt Peak || Spacewatch || — || align=right | 4.5 km || 
|-id=041 bgcolor=#d6d6d6
| 328041 ||  || — || June 10, 2007 || Kitt Peak || Spacewatch || — || align=right | 3.5 km || 
|-id=042 bgcolor=#d6d6d6
| 328042 ||  || — || June 13, 2007 || Anderson Mesa || LONEOS || EUP || align=right | 6.6 km || 
|-id=043 bgcolor=#d6d6d6
| 328043 ||  || — || June 15, 2007 || Catalina || CSS || — || align=right | 4.8 km || 
|-id=044 bgcolor=#d6d6d6
| 328044 ||  || — || June 17, 2007 || Kitt Peak || Spacewatch || — || align=right | 2.9 km || 
|-id=045 bgcolor=#d6d6d6
| 328045 ||  || — || June 18, 2007 || Kitt Peak || Spacewatch || VER || align=right | 4.0 km || 
|-id=046 bgcolor=#d6d6d6
| 328046 ||  || — || June 18, 2007 || Kitt Peak || Spacewatch || MEL || align=right | 3.0 km || 
|-id=047 bgcolor=#d6d6d6
| 328047 ||  || — || June 20, 2007 || Kitt Peak || Spacewatch || — || align=right | 3.4 km || 
|-id=048 bgcolor=#d6d6d6
| 328048 ||  || — || June 20, 2007 || Kitt Peak || Spacewatch || — || align=right | 2.2 km || 
|-id=049 bgcolor=#d6d6d6
| 328049 ||  || — || July 10, 2007 || Siding Spring || SSS || TIR || align=right | 3.5 km || 
|-id=050 bgcolor=#d6d6d6
| 328050 ||  || — || July 10, 2007 || Siding Spring || SSS || TIR || align=right | 3.4 km || 
|-id=051 bgcolor=#d6d6d6
| 328051 || 2007 OW || — || July 17, 2007 || La Sagra || OAM Obs. || URS || align=right | 4.6 km || 
|-id=052 bgcolor=#fefefe
| 328052 ||  || — || September 13, 2007 || Anderson Mesa || LONEOS || H || align=right data-sort-value="0.95" | 950 m || 
|-id=053 bgcolor=#fefefe
| 328053 ||  || — || October 11, 2007 || Catalina || CSS || H || align=right data-sort-value="0.61" | 610 m || 
|-id=054 bgcolor=#d6d6d6
| 328054 ||  || — || October 6, 2007 || Socorro || LINEAR || 3:2 || align=right | 5.6 km || 
|-id=055 bgcolor=#fefefe
| 328055 ||  || — || October 8, 2007 || Kitt Peak || Spacewatch || — || align=right data-sort-value="0.71" | 710 m || 
|-id=056 bgcolor=#fefefe
| 328056 ||  || — || October 12, 2007 || Kitt Peak || Spacewatch || — || align=right data-sort-value="0.80" | 800 m || 
|-id=057 bgcolor=#fefefe
| 328057 ||  || — || October 11, 2007 || Kitt Peak || Spacewatch || — || align=right data-sort-value="0.71" | 710 m || 
|-id=058 bgcolor=#fefefe
| 328058 ||  || — || October 9, 2007 || Catalina || CSS || — || align=right | 1.3 km || 
|-id=059 bgcolor=#FFC2E0
| 328059 ||  || — || October 19, 2007 || Socorro || LINEAR || AMO || align=right data-sort-value="0.47" | 470 m || 
|-id=060 bgcolor=#fefefe
| 328060 ||  || — || October 20, 2007 || Catalina || CSS || — || align=right data-sort-value="0.68" | 680 m || 
|-id=061 bgcolor=#fefefe
| 328061 ||  || — || October 20, 2007 || Mount Lemmon || Mount Lemmon Survey || — || align=right data-sort-value="0.67" | 670 m || 
|-id=062 bgcolor=#fefefe
| 328062 ||  || — || October 30, 2007 || Mount Lemmon || Mount Lemmon Survey || — || align=right data-sort-value="0.57" | 570 m || 
|-id=063 bgcolor=#fefefe
| 328063 ||  || — || May 12, 2004 || Catalina || CSS || H || align=right data-sort-value="0.99" | 990 m || 
|-id=064 bgcolor=#fefefe
| 328064 ||  || — || November 1, 2007 || Kitt Peak || Spacewatch || — || align=right data-sort-value="0.74" | 740 m || 
|-id=065 bgcolor=#fefefe
| 328065 ||  || — || November 4, 2007 || Mount Lemmon || Mount Lemmon Survey || — || align=right data-sort-value="0.97" | 970 m || 
|-id=066 bgcolor=#fefefe
| 328066 ||  || — || November 5, 2007 || Mount Lemmon || Mount Lemmon Survey || FLO || align=right data-sort-value="0.65" | 650 m || 
|-id=067 bgcolor=#fefefe
| 328067 ||  || — || November 6, 2007 || Mount Lemmon || Mount Lemmon Survey || FLO || align=right data-sort-value="0.62" | 620 m || 
|-id=068 bgcolor=#fefefe
| 328068 ||  || — || November 11, 2007 || Mount Lemmon || Mount Lemmon Survey || — || align=right data-sort-value="0.74" | 740 m || 
|-id=069 bgcolor=#fefefe
| 328069 ||  || — || November 14, 2007 || Bisei SG Center || BATTeRS || FLO || align=right data-sort-value="0.63" | 630 m || 
|-id=070 bgcolor=#fefefe
| 328070 ||  || — || November 6, 2007 || Mount Lemmon || Mount Lemmon Survey || — || align=right data-sort-value="0.87" | 870 m || 
|-id=071 bgcolor=#fefefe
| 328071 ||  || — || November 3, 2007 || Mount Lemmon || Mount Lemmon Survey || — || align=right data-sort-value="0.74" | 740 m || 
|-id=072 bgcolor=#fefefe
| 328072 ||  || — || November 16, 2007 || Tiki || N. Teamo || — || align=right data-sort-value="0.83" | 830 m || 
|-id=073 bgcolor=#fefefe
| 328073 ||  || — || November 18, 2007 || Socorro || LINEAR || — || align=right data-sort-value="0.75" | 750 m || 
|-id=074 bgcolor=#fefefe
| 328074 ||  || — || November 18, 2007 || Mount Lemmon || Mount Lemmon Survey || — || align=right data-sort-value="0.91" | 910 m || 
|-id=075 bgcolor=#fefefe
| 328075 ||  || — || March 17, 2005 || Mount Lemmon || Mount Lemmon Survey || FLO || align=right data-sort-value="0.75" | 750 m || 
|-id=076 bgcolor=#fefefe
| 328076 ||  || — || December 6, 2007 || Kitt Peak || Spacewatch || — || align=right data-sort-value="0.77" | 770 m || 
|-id=077 bgcolor=#fefefe
| 328077 ||  || — || December 15, 2007 || Kitt Peak || Spacewatch || — || align=right data-sort-value="0.69" | 690 m || 
|-id=078 bgcolor=#FA8072
| 328078 ||  || — || December 15, 2007 || Catalina || CSS || — || align=right data-sort-value="0.81" | 810 m || 
|-id=079 bgcolor=#fefefe
| 328079 ||  || — || December 14, 2007 || Socorro || LINEAR || — || align=right data-sort-value="0.80" | 800 m || 
|-id=080 bgcolor=#fefefe
| 328080 ||  || — || December 15, 2007 || Kitt Peak || Spacewatch || — || align=right | 1.1 km || 
|-id=081 bgcolor=#fefefe
| 328081 ||  || — || February 2, 2005 || Kitt Peak || Spacewatch || — || align=right data-sort-value="0.68" | 680 m || 
|-id=082 bgcolor=#fefefe
| 328082 ||  || — || December 4, 2007 || Socorro || LINEAR || — || align=right data-sort-value="0.96" | 960 m || 
|-id=083 bgcolor=#fefefe
| 328083 ||  || — || December 5, 2007 || Kitt Peak || Spacewatch || — || align=right data-sort-value="0.98" | 980 m || 
|-id=084 bgcolor=#fefefe
| 328084 ||  || — || December 18, 2007 || Mount Lemmon || Mount Lemmon Survey || — || align=right | 1.0 km || 
|-id=085 bgcolor=#fefefe
| 328085 ||  || — || December 15, 2007 || Kitt Peak || Spacewatch || — || align=right data-sort-value="0.89" | 890 m || 
|-id=086 bgcolor=#fefefe
| 328086 ||  || — || December 30, 2007 || Mount Lemmon || Mount Lemmon Survey || V || align=right data-sort-value="0.82" | 820 m || 
|-id=087 bgcolor=#fefefe
| 328087 ||  || — || November 11, 2007 || Mount Lemmon || Mount Lemmon Survey || NYS || align=right data-sort-value="0.68" | 680 m || 
|-id=088 bgcolor=#fefefe
| 328088 ||  || — || December 28, 2007 || Kitt Peak || Spacewatch || NYS || align=right data-sort-value="0.63" | 630 m || 
|-id=089 bgcolor=#fefefe
| 328089 ||  || — || December 31, 2007 || Mount Lemmon || Mount Lemmon Survey || — || align=right data-sort-value="0.80" | 800 m || 
|-id=090 bgcolor=#fefefe
| 328090 ||  || — || December 31, 2007 || Mount Lemmon || Mount Lemmon Survey || CLA || align=right | 1.6 km || 
|-id=091 bgcolor=#fefefe
| 328091 ||  || — || December 31, 2007 || Kitt Peak || Spacewatch || — || align=right data-sort-value="0.82" | 820 m || 
|-id=092 bgcolor=#fefefe
| 328092 ||  || — || December 30, 2007 || Kitt Peak || Spacewatch || NYS || align=right data-sort-value="0.64" | 640 m || 
|-id=093 bgcolor=#fefefe
| 328093 ||  || — || December 30, 2007 || Kitt Peak || Spacewatch || NYS || align=right data-sort-value="0.66" | 660 m || 
|-id=094 bgcolor=#fefefe
| 328094 ||  || — || December 30, 2007 || Kitt Peak || Spacewatch || FLO || align=right data-sort-value="0.63" | 630 m || 
|-id=095 bgcolor=#fefefe
| 328095 ||  || — || December 18, 2007 || Mount Lemmon || Mount Lemmon Survey || — || align=right data-sort-value="0.99" | 990 m || 
|-id=096 bgcolor=#fefefe
| 328096 ||  || — || January 1, 2008 || Kitt Peak || Spacewatch || ERI || align=right | 1.6 km || 
|-id=097 bgcolor=#fefefe
| 328097 ||  || — || January 10, 2008 || Mount Lemmon || Mount Lemmon Survey || — || align=right data-sort-value="0.90" | 900 m || 
|-id=098 bgcolor=#fefefe
| 328098 ||  || — || January 10, 2008 || Mount Lemmon || Mount Lemmon Survey || — || align=right data-sort-value="0.68" | 680 m || 
|-id=099 bgcolor=#fefefe
| 328099 ||  || — || January 10, 2008 || Kitt Peak || Spacewatch || — || align=right data-sort-value="0.91" | 910 m || 
|-id=100 bgcolor=#fefefe
| 328100 ||  || — || January 10, 2008 || Mount Lemmon || Mount Lemmon Survey || — || align=right data-sort-value="0.79" | 790 m || 
|}

328101–328200 

|-bgcolor=#fefefe
| 328101 ||  || — || January 10, 2008 || Mount Lemmon || Mount Lemmon Survey || NYS || align=right data-sort-value="0.64" | 640 m || 
|-id=102 bgcolor=#fefefe
| 328102 ||  || — || December 30, 2007 || Mount Lemmon || Mount Lemmon Survey || — || align=right data-sort-value="0.92" | 920 m || 
|-id=103 bgcolor=#fefefe
| 328103 ||  || — || January 10, 2008 || Mount Lemmon || Mount Lemmon Survey || V || align=right data-sort-value="0.75" | 750 m || 
|-id=104 bgcolor=#fefefe
| 328104 ||  || — || January 10, 2008 || Mount Lemmon || Mount Lemmon Survey || NYS || align=right data-sort-value="0.70" | 700 m || 
|-id=105 bgcolor=#fefefe
| 328105 ||  || — || January 12, 2008 || La Sagra || OAM Obs. || ERI || align=right | 1.5 km || 
|-id=106 bgcolor=#fefefe
| 328106 ||  || — || January 12, 2008 || La Sagra || OAM Obs. || — || align=right | 1.1 km || 
|-id=107 bgcolor=#fefefe
| 328107 ||  || — || January 10, 2008 || Kitt Peak || Spacewatch || NYS || align=right data-sort-value="0.58" | 580 m || 
|-id=108 bgcolor=#fefefe
| 328108 ||  || — || September 18, 2003 || Kitt Peak || Spacewatch || FLO || align=right data-sort-value="0.79" | 790 m || 
|-id=109 bgcolor=#fefefe
| 328109 ||  || — || December 30, 2007 || Catalina || CSS || — || align=right data-sort-value="0.81" | 810 m || 
|-id=110 bgcolor=#fefefe
| 328110 ||  || — || January 11, 2008 || Kitt Peak || Spacewatch || — || align=right data-sort-value="0.69" | 690 m || 
|-id=111 bgcolor=#fefefe
| 328111 ||  || — || January 11, 2008 || Kitt Peak || Spacewatch || NYS || align=right data-sort-value="0.67" | 670 m || 
|-id=112 bgcolor=#fefefe
| 328112 ||  || — || January 11, 2008 || Mount Lemmon || Mount Lemmon Survey || — || align=right data-sort-value="0.82" | 820 m || 
|-id=113 bgcolor=#fefefe
| 328113 ||  || — || January 11, 2008 || Kitt Peak || Spacewatch || — || align=right | 1.00 km || 
|-id=114 bgcolor=#fefefe
| 328114 ||  || — || January 11, 2008 || Kitt Peak || Spacewatch || MAS || align=right data-sort-value="0.61" | 610 m || 
|-id=115 bgcolor=#fefefe
| 328115 ||  || — || January 11, 2008 || Kitt Peak || Spacewatch || V || align=right data-sort-value="0.83" | 830 m || 
|-id=116 bgcolor=#fefefe
| 328116 ||  || — || December 4, 2007 || Mount Lemmon || Mount Lemmon Survey || — || align=right | 1.2 km || 
|-id=117 bgcolor=#fefefe
| 328117 ||  || — || January 12, 2008 || Kitt Peak || Spacewatch || — || align=right data-sort-value="0.90" | 900 m || 
|-id=118 bgcolor=#fefefe
| 328118 ||  || — || January 13, 2008 || Kitt Peak || Spacewatch || — || align=right | 1.0 km || 
|-id=119 bgcolor=#fefefe
| 328119 ||  || — || December 30, 2007 || Mount Lemmon || Mount Lemmon Survey || NYS || align=right data-sort-value="0.59" | 590 m || 
|-id=120 bgcolor=#fefefe
| 328120 ||  || — || January 11, 2008 || Kitt Peak || Spacewatch || — || align=right data-sort-value="0.72" | 720 m || 
|-id=121 bgcolor=#fefefe
| 328121 ||  || — || January 14, 2008 || Kitt Peak || Spacewatch || V || align=right data-sort-value="0.65" | 650 m || 
|-id=122 bgcolor=#fefefe
| 328122 ||  || — || January 14, 2008 || Kitt Peak || Spacewatch || — || align=right data-sort-value="0.74" | 740 m || 
|-id=123 bgcolor=#fefefe
| 328123 ||  || — || January 12, 2008 || Mount Lemmon || Mount Lemmon Survey || — || align=right data-sort-value="0.89" | 890 m || 
|-id=124 bgcolor=#fefefe
| 328124 ||  || — || January 15, 2008 || Mount Lemmon || Mount Lemmon Survey || — || align=right data-sort-value="0.54" | 540 m || 
|-id=125 bgcolor=#fefefe
| 328125 ||  || — || January 15, 2008 || Kitt Peak || Spacewatch || MAS || align=right data-sort-value="0.66" | 660 m || 
|-id=126 bgcolor=#fefefe
| 328126 ||  || — || January 11, 2008 || Kitt Peak || Spacewatch || NYS || align=right data-sort-value="0.59" | 590 m || 
|-id=127 bgcolor=#fefefe
| 328127 ||  || — || January 16, 2008 || Mount Lemmon || Mount Lemmon Survey || — || align=right data-sort-value="0.98" | 980 m || 
|-id=128 bgcolor=#fefefe
| 328128 ||  || — || January 19, 2008 || Pla D'Arguines || R. Ferrando || — || align=right data-sort-value="0.74" | 740 m || 
|-id=129 bgcolor=#fefefe
| 328129 ||  || — || January 16, 2008 || Kitt Peak || Spacewatch || V || align=right data-sort-value="0.74" | 740 m || 
|-id=130 bgcolor=#fefefe
| 328130 ||  || — || January 16, 2008 || Kitt Peak || Spacewatch || ERI || align=right | 1.8 km || 
|-id=131 bgcolor=#fefefe
| 328131 ||  || — || January 16, 2008 || Kitt Peak || Spacewatch || — || align=right data-sort-value="0.88" | 880 m || 
|-id=132 bgcolor=#fefefe
| 328132 ||  || — || January 13, 2008 || Kitt Peak || Spacewatch || — || align=right data-sort-value="0.95" | 950 m || 
|-id=133 bgcolor=#fefefe
| 328133 ||  || — || January 30, 2008 || Kitt Peak || Spacewatch || — || align=right | 1.00 km || 
|-id=134 bgcolor=#fefefe
| 328134 ||  || — || January 31, 2008 || Mount Lemmon || Mount Lemmon Survey || — || align=right data-sort-value="0.81" | 810 m || 
|-id=135 bgcolor=#fefefe
| 328135 ||  || — || January 31, 2008 || Mount Lemmon || Mount Lemmon Survey || — || align=right data-sort-value="0.98" | 980 m || 
|-id=136 bgcolor=#fefefe
| 328136 ||  || — || January 30, 2008 || Catalina || CSS || — || align=right data-sort-value="0.76" | 760 m || 
|-id=137 bgcolor=#fefefe
| 328137 ||  || — || June 18, 1998 || Kitt Peak || Spacewatch || — || align=right | 1.1 km || 
|-id=138 bgcolor=#fefefe
| 328138 ||  || — || January 30, 2008 || Kitt Peak || Spacewatch || MAS || align=right data-sort-value="0.79" | 790 m || 
|-id=139 bgcolor=#fefefe
| 328139 ||  || — || January 30, 2008 || Kitt Peak || Spacewatch || — || align=right data-sort-value="0.85" | 850 m || 
|-id=140 bgcolor=#fefefe
| 328140 ||  || — || January 31, 2008 || Mount Lemmon || Mount Lemmon Survey || NYS || align=right data-sort-value="0.56" | 560 m || 
|-id=141 bgcolor=#fefefe
| 328141 ||  || — || January 30, 2008 || Catalina || CSS || FLO || align=right data-sort-value="0.62" | 620 m || 
|-id=142 bgcolor=#fefefe
| 328142 ||  || — || January 30, 2008 || Mount Lemmon || Mount Lemmon Survey || V || align=right | 1.0 km || 
|-id=143 bgcolor=#fefefe
| 328143 ||  || — || January 30, 2008 || Mount Lemmon || Mount Lemmon Survey || — || align=right data-sort-value="0.87" | 870 m || 
|-id=144 bgcolor=#fefefe
| 328144 ||  || — || January 16, 2008 || Kitt Peak || Spacewatch || — || align=right data-sort-value="0.88" | 880 m || 
|-id=145 bgcolor=#fefefe
| 328145 ||  || — || February 1, 2008 || La Sagra || OAM Obs. || — || align=right data-sort-value="0.98" | 980 m || 
|-id=146 bgcolor=#fefefe
| 328146 ||  || — || February 2, 2008 || Mount Lemmon || Mount Lemmon Survey || — || align=right data-sort-value="0.80" | 800 m || 
|-id=147 bgcolor=#fefefe
| 328147 ||  || — || February 1, 2008 || Kitt Peak || Spacewatch || V || align=right data-sort-value="0.85" | 850 m || 
|-id=148 bgcolor=#fefefe
| 328148 ||  || — || February 2, 2008 || Kitt Peak || Spacewatch || V || align=right data-sort-value="0.58" | 580 m || 
|-id=149 bgcolor=#fefefe
| 328149 ||  || — || February 2, 2008 || Kitt Peak || Spacewatch || V || align=right data-sort-value="0.65" | 650 m || 
|-id=150 bgcolor=#fefefe
| 328150 ||  || — || February 2, 2008 || Kitt Peak || Spacewatch || NYS || align=right data-sort-value="0.58" | 580 m || 
|-id=151 bgcolor=#fefefe
| 328151 ||  || — || February 7, 2008 || Catalina || CSS || ERI || align=right | 1.5 km || 
|-id=152 bgcolor=#fefefe
| 328152 ||  || — || February 8, 2008 || Mount Lemmon || Mount Lemmon Survey || — || align=right data-sort-value="0.85" | 850 m || 
|-id=153 bgcolor=#fefefe
| 328153 ||  || — || February 7, 2008 || Mount Lemmon || Mount Lemmon Survey || NYS || align=right data-sort-value="0.71" | 710 m || 
|-id=154 bgcolor=#fefefe
| 328154 ||  || — || January 30, 2008 || Socorro || LINEAR || — || align=right data-sort-value="0.77" | 770 m || 
|-id=155 bgcolor=#fefefe
| 328155 ||  || — || February 8, 2008 || Kitt Peak || Spacewatch || FLO || align=right data-sort-value="0.64" | 640 m || 
|-id=156 bgcolor=#fefefe
| 328156 ||  || — || February 8, 2008 || Kitt Peak || Spacewatch || NYS || align=right data-sort-value="0.71" | 710 m || 
|-id=157 bgcolor=#fefefe
| 328157 ||  || — || September 18, 2006 || Kitt Peak || Spacewatch || NYS || align=right data-sort-value="0.73" | 730 m || 
|-id=158 bgcolor=#fefefe
| 328158 ||  || — || February 8, 2008 || Kitt Peak || Spacewatch || — || align=right data-sort-value="0.64" | 640 m || 
|-id=159 bgcolor=#fefefe
| 328159 ||  || — || February 8, 2008 || Kitt Peak || Spacewatch || — || align=right data-sort-value="0.90" | 900 m || 
|-id=160 bgcolor=#fefefe
| 328160 ||  || — || February 8, 2008 || Kitt Peak || Spacewatch || — || align=right data-sort-value="0.83" | 830 m || 
|-id=161 bgcolor=#fefefe
| 328161 ||  || — || February 9, 2008 || Catalina || CSS || ERI || align=right | 1.8 km || 
|-id=162 bgcolor=#fefefe
| 328162 ||  || — || February 6, 2008 || Anderson Mesa || LONEOS || NYS || align=right data-sort-value="0.67" | 670 m || 
|-id=163 bgcolor=#fefefe
| 328163 ||  || — || February 6, 2008 || Purple Mountain || PMO NEO || — || align=right | 1.1 km || 
|-id=164 bgcolor=#fefefe
| 328164 ||  || — || February 3, 2008 || Catalina || CSS || — || align=right | 1.0 km || 
|-id=165 bgcolor=#E9E9E9
| 328165 ||  || — || February 10, 2008 || Mount Lemmon || Mount Lemmon Survey || — || align=right data-sort-value="0.95" | 950 m || 
|-id=166 bgcolor=#fefefe
| 328166 ||  || — || February 2, 2008 || Kitt Peak || Spacewatch || — || align=right data-sort-value="0.87" | 870 m || 
|-id=167 bgcolor=#fefefe
| 328167 ||  || — || February 10, 2008 || Mount Lemmon || Mount Lemmon Survey || — || align=right data-sort-value="0.69" | 690 m || 
|-id=168 bgcolor=#fefefe
| 328168 ||  || — || February 10, 2008 || Kitt Peak || Spacewatch || NYS || align=right data-sort-value="0.67" | 670 m || 
|-id=169 bgcolor=#fefefe
| 328169 ||  || — || February 12, 2008 || Kitt Peak || Spacewatch || — || align=right | 1.1 km || 
|-id=170 bgcolor=#fefefe
| 328170 ||  || — || February 2, 2008 || Kitt Peak || Spacewatch || NYS || align=right data-sort-value="0.63" | 630 m || 
|-id=171 bgcolor=#fefefe
| 328171 ||  || — || September 30, 2006 || Mount Lemmon || Mount Lemmon Survey || — || align=right data-sort-value="0.90" | 900 m || 
|-id=172 bgcolor=#fefefe
| 328172 ||  || — || January 1, 2008 || Mount Lemmon || Mount Lemmon Survey || FLO || align=right data-sort-value="0.78" | 780 m || 
|-id=173 bgcolor=#fefefe
| 328173 ||  || — || February 13, 2008 || Socorro || LINEAR || V || align=right data-sort-value="0.91" | 910 m || 
|-id=174 bgcolor=#fefefe
| 328174 || 2008 DP || — || February 24, 2008 || Gaisberg || R. Gierlinger || NYS || align=right data-sort-value="0.75" | 750 m || 
|-id=175 bgcolor=#fefefe
| 328175 ||  || — || February 24, 2008 || Kitt Peak || Spacewatch || MAS || align=right data-sort-value="0.66" | 660 m || 
|-id=176 bgcolor=#fefefe
| 328176 ||  || — || February 24, 2008 || Mount Lemmon || Mount Lemmon Survey || NYS || align=right data-sort-value="0.78" | 780 m || 
|-id=177 bgcolor=#fefefe
| 328177 ||  || — || February 26, 2008 || Mount Lemmon || Mount Lemmon Survey || NYS || align=right data-sort-value="0.75" | 750 m || 
|-id=178 bgcolor=#fefefe
| 328178 ||  || — || February 26, 2008 || Mount Lemmon || Mount Lemmon Survey || MAS || align=right data-sort-value="0.78" | 780 m || 
|-id=179 bgcolor=#fefefe
| 328179 ||  || — || February 24, 2008 || Mount Lemmon || Mount Lemmon Survey || EUT || align=right data-sort-value="0.69" | 690 m || 
|-id=180 bgcolor=#fefefe
| 328180 ||  || — || February 27, 2008 || Kitt Peak || Spacewatch || NYS || align=right data-sort-value="0.84" | 840 m || 
|-id=181 bgcolor=#fefefe
| 328181 ||  || — || February 27, 2008 || Mount Lemmon || Mount Lemmon Survey || SVE || align=right | 2.0 km || 
|-id=182 bgcolor=#fefefe
| 328182 ||  || — || February 27, 2008 || Mount Lemmon || Mount Lemmon Survey || MAS || align=right data-sort-value="0.67" | 670 m || 
|-id=183 bgcolor=#fefefe
| 328183 ||  || — || March 21, 1993 || La Silla || UESAC || — || align=right data-sort-value="0.67" | 670 m || 
|-id=184 bgcolor=#E9E9E9
| 328184 ||  || — || February 27, 2008 || Catalina || CSS || ADE || align=right | 2.6 km || 
|-id=185 bgcolor=#fefefe
| 328185 ||  || — || February 27, 2008 || Lulin Observatory || LUSS || — || align=right | 1.1 km || 
|-id=186 bgcolor=#fefefe
| 328186 ||  || — || February 26, 2008 || Kitt Peak || Spacewatch || — || align=right data-sort-value="0.75" | 750 m || 
|-id=187 bgcolor=#fefefe
| 328187 ||  || — || February 27, 2008 || Mount Lemmon || Mount Lemmon Survey || NYS || align=right data-sort-value="0.74" | 740 m || 
|-id=188 bgcolor=#fefefe
| 328188 ||  || — || February 28, 2008 || Catalina || CSS || — || align=right | 1.1 km || 
|-id=189 bgcolor=#fefefe
| 328189 ||  || — || February 26, 2008 || Mount Lemmon || Mount Lemmon Survey || MAS || align=right data-sort-value="0.79" | 790 m || 
|-id=190 bgcolor=#fefefe
| 328190 ||  || — || February 27, 2008 || Mount Lemmon || Mount Lemmon Survey || — || align=right data-sort-value="0.82" | 820 m || 
|-id=191 bgcolor=#fefefe
| 328191 ||  || — || February 27, 2008 || Kitt Peak || Spacewatch || NYS || align=right data-sort-value="0.69" | 690 m || 
|-id=192 bgcolor=#fefefe
| 328192 ||  || — || February 24, 2008 || Kitt Peak || Spacewatch || V || align=right data-sort-value="0.61" | 610 m || 
|-id=193 bgcolor=#fefefe
| 328193 ||  || — || March 2, 2008 || Mount Lemmon || Mount Lemmon Survey || ERI || align=right | 1.7 km || 
|-id=194 bgcolor=#fefefe
| 328194 ||  || — || March 2, 2008 || Marly || P. Kocher || — || align=right data-sort-value="0.92" | 920 m || 
|-id=195 bgcolor=#fefefe
| 328195 ||  || — || March 1, 2008 || Kitt Peak || Spacewatch || NYS || align=right data-sort-value="0.73" | 730 m || 
|-id=196 bgcolor=#fefefe
| 328196 ||  || — || March 1, 2008 || Kitt Peak || Spacewatch || — || align=right data-sort-value="0.87" | 870 m || 
|-id=197 bgcolor=#fefefe
| 328197 ||  || — || March 3, 2008 || Mount Lemmon || Mount Lemmon Survey || — || align=right | 1.2 km || 
|-id=198 bgcolor=#fefefe
| 328198 ||  || — || July 19, 2001 || Palomar || NEAT || V || align=right data-sort-value="0.89" | 890 m || 
|-id=199 bgcolor=#d6d6d6
| 328199 ||  || — || March 4, 2008 || Kitt Peak || Spacewatch || — || align=right | 3.3 km || 
|-id=200 bgcolor=#E9E9E9
| 328200 ||  || — || March 5, 2008 || Kitt Peak || Spacewatch || — || align=right | 1.5 km || 
|}

328201–328300 

|-bgcolor=#E9E9E9
| 328201 ||  || — || March 5, 2008 || Kitt Peak || Spacewatch || KON || align=right | 2.6 km || 
|-id=202 bgcolor=#fefefe
| 328202 ||  || — || March 6, 2008 || Mount Lemmon || Mount Lemmon Survey || — || align=right data-sort-value="0.86" | 860 m || 
|-id=203 bgcolor=#fefefe
| 328203 ||  || — || March 6, 2008 || Kitt Peak || Spacewatch || V || align=right data-sort-value="0.85" | 850 m || 
|-id=204 bgcolor=#fefefe
| 328204 ||  || — || March 6, 2008 || Kitt Peak || Spacewatch || — || align=right data-sort-value="0.95" | 950 m || 
|-id=205 bgcolor=#fefefe
| 328205 ||  || — || March 7, 2008 || Mount Lemmon || Mount Lemmon Survey || V || align=right data-sort-value="0.72" | 720 m || 
|-id=206 bgcolor=#fefefe
| 328206 ||  || — || March 10, 2008 || Bisei SG Center || BATTeRS || — || align=right | 1.1 km || 
|-id=207 bgcolor=#fefefe
| 328207 ||  || — || March 9, 2008 || Needville || J. Dellinger, M. Eastman || — || align=right | 1.2 km || 
|-id=208 bgcolor=#fefefe
| 328208 ||  || — || March 9, 2008 || Kitt Peak || Spacewatch || MAS || align=right data-sort-value="0.75" | 750 m || 
|-id=209 bgcolor=#fefefe
| 328209 ||  || — || March 4, 2008 || Socorro || LINEAR || — || align=right | 1.0 km || 
|-id=210 bgcolor=#fefefe
| 328210 ||  || — || March 8, 2008 || Socorro || LINEAR || — || align=right | 1.1 km || 
|-id=211 bgcolor=#fefefe
| 328211 ||  || — || March 7, 2008 || Mount Lemmon || Mount Lemmon Survey || NYS || align=right data-sort-value="0.58" | 580 m || 
|-id=212 bgcolor=#fefefe
| 328212 ||  || — || March 7, 2008 || Mount Lemmon || Mount Lemmon Survey || NYS || align=right data-sort-value="0.61" | 610 m || 
|-id=213 bgcolor=#fefefe
| 328213 ||  || — || March 8, 2008 || Kitt Peak || Spacewatch || — || align=right | 1.1 km || 
|-id=214 bgcolor=#fefefe
| 328214 ||  || — || March 8, 2008 || Mount Lemmon || Mount Lemmon Survey || V || align=right data-sort-value="0.60" | 600 m || 
|-id=215 bgcolor=#fefefe
| 328215 ||  || — || March 9, 2008 || Kitt Peak || Spacewatch || NYS || align=right data-sort-value="0.74" | 740 m || 
|-id=216 bgcolor=#fefefe
| 328216 ||  || — || March 11, 2008 || Kitt Peak || Spacewatch || — || align=right data-sort-value="0.98" | 980 m || 
|-id=217 bgcolor=#fefefe
| 328217 ||  || — || March 11, 2008 || Kitt Peak || Spacewatch || NYS || align=right data-sort-value="0.79" | 790 m || 
|-id=218 bgcolor=#fefefe
| 328218 ||  || — || March 11, 2008 || Kitt Peak || Spacewatch || — || align=right data-sort-value="0.77" | 770 m || 
|-id=219 bgcolor=#fefefe
| 328219 ||  || — || March 1, 2008 || Kitt Peak || Spacewatch || — || align=right | 1.2 km || 
|-id=220 bgcolor=#E9E9E9
| 328220 ||  || — || March 4, 2008 || Mount Lemmon || Mount Lemmon Survey || — || align=right | 1.2 km || 
|-id=221 bgcolor=#E9E9E9
| 328221 ||  || — || March 7, 2008 || Mount Lemmon || Mount Lemmon Survey || — || align=right | 2.0 km || 
|-id=222 bgcolor=#fefefe
| 328222 ||  || — || March 25, 2008 || Kitt Peak || Spacewatch || NYS || align=right data-sort-value="0.84" | 840 m || 
|-id=223 bgcolor=#E9E9E9
| 328223 ||  || — || October 1, 2005 || Kitt Peak || Spacewatch || — || align=right | 1.7 km || 
|-id=224 bgcolor=#fefefe
| 328224 ||  || — || March 26, 2008 || Kitt Peak || Spacewatch || NYS || align=right data-sort-value="0.77" | 770 m || 
|-id=225 bgcolor=#fefefe
| 328225 ||  || — || March 26, 2008 || Mount Lemmon || Mount Lemmon Survey || MAS || align=right data-sort-value="0.77" | 770 m || 
|-id=226 bgcolor=#E9E9E9
| 328226 ||  || — || March 26, 2008 || Kitt Peak || Spacewatch || — || align=right | 1.1 km || 
|-id=227 bgcolor=#E9E9E9
| 328227 ||  || — || March 27, 2008 || Kitt Peak || Spacewatch || — || align=right | 1.5 km || 
|-id=228 bgcolor=#fefefe
| 328228 ||  || — || March 28, 2008 || Mount Lemmon || Mount Lemmon Survey || NYS || align=right data-sort-value="0.81" | 810 m || 
|-id=229 bgcolor=#fefefe
| 328229 ||  || — || March 10, 2008 || Kitt Peak || Spacewatch || V || align=right | 1.0 km || 
|-id=230 bgcolor=#E9E9E9
| 328230 ||  || — || March 28, 2008 || Mount Lemmon || Mount Lemmon Survey || — || align=right | 1.3 km || 
|-id=231 bgcolor=#fefefe
| 328231 ||  || — || March 28, 2008 || Mount Lemmon || Mount Lemmon Survey || — || align=right data-sort-value="0.89" | 890 m || 
|-id=232 bgcolor=#E9E9E9
| 328232 ||  || — || March 28, 2008 || Kitt Peak || Spacewatch || — || align=right | 1.1 km || 
|-id=233 bgcolor=#E9E9E9
| 328233 ||  || — || March 28, 2008 || Mount Lemmon || Mount Lemmon Survey || — || align=right data-sort-value="0.88" | 880 m || 
|-id=234 bgcolor=#fefefe
| 328234 ||  || — || March 28, 2008 || Mount Lemmon || Mount Lemmon Survey || — || align=right | 1.2 km || 
|-id=235 bgcolor=#E9E9E9
| 328235 ||  || — || March 28, 2008 || Mount Lemmon || Mount Lemmon Survey || HNS || align=right | 1.4 km || 
|-id=236 bgcolor=#E9E9E9
| 328236 ||  || — || March 29, 2008 || Mount Lemmon || Mount Lemmon Survey || — || align=right | 1.9 km || 
|-id=237 bgcolor=#fefefe
| 328237 ||  || — || March 27, 2008 || Kitt Peak || Spacewatch || — || align=right data-sort-value="0.94" | 940 m || 
|-id=238 bgcolor=#fefefe
| 328238 ||  || — || March 27, 2008 || Kitt Peak || Spacewatch || — || align=right | 1.1 km || 
|-id=239 bgcolor=#E9E9E9
| 328239 ||  || — || March 28, 2008 || Kitt Peak || Spacewatch || — || align=right data-sort-value="0.95" | 950 m || 
|-id=240 bgcolor=#E9E9E9
| 328240 ||  || — || March 28, 2008 || Kitt Peak || Spacewatch || — || align=right | 1.3 km || 
|-id=241 bgcolor=#E9E9E9
| 328241 ||  || — || March 28, 2008 || Kitt Peak || Spacewatch || — || align=right | 1.4 km || 
|-id=242 bgcolor=#E9E9E9
| 328242 ||  || — || March 28, 2008 || Mount Lemmon || Mount Lemmon Survey || — || align=right | 3.0 km || 
|-id=243 bgcolor=#E9E9E9
| 328243 ||  || — || March 29, 2008 || Kitt Peak || Spacewatch || — || align=right | 1.9 km || 
|-id=244 bgcolor=#fefefe
| 328244 ||  || — || March 27, 2008 || Kitt Peak || Spacewatch || — || align=right data-sort-value="0.99" | 990 m || 
|-id=245 bgcolor=#fefefe
| 328245 ||  || — || March 28, 2008 || Mount Lemmon || Mount Lemmon Survey || — || align=right data-sort-value="0.86" | 860 m || 
|-id=246 bgcolor=#fefefe
| 328246 ||  || — || March 29, 2008 || Mount Lemmon || Mount Lemmon Survey || FLO || align=right data-sort-value="0.77" | 770 m || 
|-id=247 bgcolor=#E9E9E9
| 328247 ||  || — || March 30, 2008 || Kitt Peak || Spacewatch || — || align=right | 2.6 km || 
|-id=248 bgcolor=#E9E9E9
| 328248 ||  || — || March 30, 2008 || Kitt Peak || Spacewatch || — || align=right | 1.1 km || 
|-id=249 bgcolor=#E9E9E9
| 328249 ||  || — || March 31, 2008 || Kitt Peak || Spacewatch || — || align=right data-sort-value="0.91" | 910 m || 
|-id=250 bgcolor=#fefefe
| 328250 ||  || — || March 31, 2008 || Kitt Peak || Spacewatch || V || align=right data-sort-value="0.71" | 710 m || 
|-id=251 bgcolor=#E9E9E9
| 328251 ||  || — || March 31, 2008 || Kitt Peak || Spacewatch || — || align=right | 1.0 km || 
|-id=252 bgcolor=#E9E9E9
| 328252 ||  || — || March 31, 2008 || Kitt Peak || Spacewatch || MAR || align=right | 1.1 km || 
|-id=253 bgcolor=#E9E9E9
| 328253 ||  || — || March 31, 2008 || Mount Lemmon || Mount Lemmon Survey || — || align=right | 1.00 km || 
|-id=254 bgcolor=#fefefe
| 328254 ||  || — || March 31, 2008 || Kitt Peak || Spacewatch || V || align=right data-sort-value="0.79" | 790 m || 
|-id=255 bgcolor=#E9E9E9
| 328255 ||  || — || March 29, 2008 || Kitt Peak || Spacewatch || MIT || align=right | 3.1 km || 
|-id=256 bgcolor=#fefefe
| 328256 ||  || — || March 29, 2008 || Catalina || CSS || V || align=right data-sort-value="0.86" | 860 m || 
|-id=257 bgcolor=#fefefe
| 328257 ||  || — || March 28, 2008 || Kitt Peak || Spacewatch || — || align=right | 1.1 km || 
|-id=258 bgcolor=#E9E9E9
| 328258 ||  || — || March 27, 2008 || Mount Lemmon || Mount Lemmon Survey || — || align=right | 1.1 km || 
|-id=259 bgcolor=#E9E9E9
| 328259 ||  || — || March 29, 2008 || Kitt Peak || Spacewatch || — || align=right | 1.5 km || 
|-id=260 bgcolor=#fefefe
| 328260 ||  || — || April 1, 2008 || Kitt Peak || Spacewatch || — || align=right data-sort-value="0.81" | 810 m || 
|-id=261 bgcolor=#E9E9E9
| 328261 ||  || — || March 28, 2008 || Kitt Peak || Spacewatch || — || align=right | 1.9 km || 
|-id=262 bgcolor=#fefefe
| 328262 ||  || — || April 3, 2008 || Mount Lemmon || Mount Lemmon Survey || MAS || align=right data-sort-value="0.66" | 660 m || 
|-id=263 bgcolor=#fefefe
| 328263 ||  || — || April 4, 2008 || Mount Lemmon || Mount Lemmon Survey || — || align=right | 1.3 km || 
|-id=264 bgcolor=#E9E9E9
| 328264 ||  || — || April 8, 2008 || Desert Eagle || W. K. Y. Yeung || — || align=right | 1.0 km || 
|-id=265 bgcolor=#fefefe
| 328265 ||  || — || April 1, 2008 || Mount Lemmon || Mount Lemmon Survey || — || align=right | 1.0 km || 
|-id=266 bgcolor=#fefefe
| 328266 ||  || — || April 1, 2008 || Mount Lemmon || Mount Lemmon Survey || — || align=right data-sort-value="0.73" | 730 m || 
|-id=267 bgcolor=#E9E9E9
| 328267 ||  || — || April 3, 2008 || Mount Lemmon || Mount Lemmon Survey || — || align=right | 2.3 km || 
|-id=268 bgcolor=#E9E9E9
| 328268 ||  || — || April 3, 2008 || Kitt Peak || Spacewatch || — || align=right | 1.6 km || 
|-id=269 bgcolor=#E9E9E9
| 328269 ||  || — || April 3, 2008 || Kitt Peak || Spacewatch || — || align=right | 1.5 km || 
|-id=270 bgcolor=#E9E9E9
| 328270 ||  || — || April 4, 2008 || Mount Lemmon || Mount Lemmon Survey || MAR || align=right | 1.2 km || 
|-id=271 bgcolor=#E9E9E9
| 328271 ||  || — || April 4, 2008 || Kitt Peak || Spacewatch || — || align=right | 1.7 km || 
|-id=272 bgcolor=#fefefe
| 328272 ||  || — || April 5, 2008 || Kitt Peak || Spacewatch || NYS || align=right data-sort-value="0.87" | 870 m || 
|-id=273 bgcolor=#fefefe
| 328273 ||  || — || September 19, 1998 || Kitt Peak || Spacewatch || V || align=right data-sort-value="0.73" | 730 m || 
|-id=274 bgcolor=#fefefe
| 328274 ||  || — || April 5, 2008 || Mount Lemmon || Mount Lemmon Survey || — || align=right | 1.1 km || 
|-id=275 bgcolor=#E9E9E9
| 328275 ||  || — || April 5, 2008 || Kitt Peak || Spacewatch || — || align=right | 1.3 km || 
|-id=276 bgcolor=#fefefe
| 328276 ||  || — || April 5, 2008 || Kitt Peak || Spacewatch || — || align=right data-sort-value="0.93" | 930 m || 
|-id=277 bgcolor=#fefefe
| 328277 ||  || — || April 5, 2008 || Mount Lemmon || Mount Lemmon Survey || — || align=right data-sort-value="0.81" | 810 m || 
|-id=278 bgcolor=#E9E9E9
| 328278 ||  || — || April 6, 2008 || Kitt Peak || Spacewatch || — || align=right | 1.8 km || 
|-id=279 bgcolor=#E9E9E9
| 328279 ||  || — || April 6, 2008 || Kitt Peak || Spacewatch || — || align=right | 1.1 km || 
|-id=280 bgcolor=#E9E9E9
| 328280 ||  || — || April 6, 2008 || Mount Lemmon || Mount Lemmon Survey || — || align=right | 1.3 km || 
|-id=281 bgcolor=#E9E9E9
| 328281 ||  || — || April 8, 2008 || Kitt Peak || Spacewatch || — || align=right | 1.2 km || 
|-id=282 bgcolor=#fefefe
| 328282 ||  || — || April 10, 2008 || Kitt Peak || Spacewatch || NYS || align=right data-sort-value="0.79" | 790 m || 
|-id=283 bgcolor=#fefefe
| 328283 ||  || — || April 6, 2008 || Mount Lemmon || Mount Lemmon Survey || — || align=right data-sort-value="0.80" | 800 m || 
|-id=284 bgcolor=#E9E9E9
| 328284 ||  || — || April 8, 2008 || Kitt Peak || Spacewatch || — || align=right | 1.4 km || 
|-id=285 bgcolor=#E9E9E9
| 328285 ||  || — || April 10, 2008 || Kitt Peak || Spacewatch || — || align=right data-sort-value="0.99" | 990 m || 
|-id=286 bgcolor=#E9E9E9
| 328286 ||  || — || April 10, 2008 || Kitt Peak || Spacewatch || — || align=right | 1.7 km || 
|-id=287 bgcolor=#E9E9E9
| 328287 ||  || — || April 13, 2008 || Mount Lemmon || Mount Lemmon Survey || — || align=right | 3.0 km || 
|-id=288 bgcolor=#E9E9E9
| 328288 ||  || — || April 13, 2008 || Mount Lemmon || Mount Lemmon Survey || BRG || align=right | 1.3 km || 
|-id=289 bgcolor=#E9E9E9
| 328289 ||  || — || April 6, 2008 || Socorro || LINEAR || EUN || align=right | 1.5 km || 
|-id=290 bgcolor=#fefefe
| 328290 ||  || — || April 9, 2008 || Kitt Peak || Spacewatch || SUL || align=right | 2.3 km || 
|-id=291 bgcolor=#E9E9E9
| 328291 ||  || — || April 11, 2008 || Kitt Peak || Spacewatch || — || align=right | 1.0 km || 
|-id=292 bgcolor=#E9E9E9
| 328292 ||  || — || April 13, 2008 || Kitt Peak || Spacewatch || — || align=right | 1.4 km || 
|-id=293 bgcolor=#E9E9E9
| 328293 ||  || — || April 1, 2008 || Kitt Peak || Spacewatch || — || align=right data-sort-value="0.87" | 870 m || 
|-id=294 bgcolor=#E9E9E9
| 328294 ||  || — || April 3, 2008 || Kitt Peak || Spacewatch || — || align=right | 1.9 km || 
|-id=295 bgcolor=#E9E9E9
| 328295 ||  || — || April 6, 2008 || Kitt Peak || Spacewatch || — || align=right | 1.2 km || 
|-id=296 bgcolor=#E9E9E9
| 328296 ||  || — || April 13, 2008 || Mount Lemmon || Mount Lemmon Survey || — || align=right | 1.3 km || 
|-id=297 bgcolor=#E9E9E9
| 328297 ||  || — || April 1, 2008 || Kitt Peak || Spacewatch || — || align=right | 1.0 km || 
|-id=298 bgcolor=#E9E9E9
| 328298 ||  || — || April 3, 2008 || Kitt Peak || Spacewatch || — || align=right | 1.1 km || 
|-id=299 bgcolor=#E9E9E9
| 328299 ||  || — || April 6, 2008 || Mount Lemmon || Mount Lemmon Survey || HNS || align=right | 1.0 km || 
|-id=300 bgcolor=#E9E9E9
| 328300 ||  || — || April 6, 2008 || Mount Lemmon || Mount Lemmon Survey || — || align=right | 1.2 km || 
|}

328301–328400 

|-bgcolor=#E9E9E9
| 328301 ||  || — || April 6, 2008 || Kitt Peak || Spacewatch || — || align=right | 1.2 km || 
|-id=302 bgcolor=#fefefe
| 328302 ||  || — || April 5, 2008 || Mount Lemmon || Mount Lemmon Survey || — || align=right | 1.1 km || 
|-id=303 bgcolor=#E9E9E9
| 328303 ||  || — || April 4, 2008 || Catalina || CSS || — || align=right | 2.1 km || 
|-id=304 bgcolor=#E9E9E9
| 328304 ||  || — || April 4, 2008 || Mount Lemmon || Mount Lemmon Survey || — || align=right | 1.5 km || 
|-id=305 bgcolor=#E9E9E9
| 328305 Jackmcdevitt || 2008 HY ||  || October 20, 2006 || Kitt Peak || L. H. Wasserman || — || align=right | 1.2 km || 
|-id=306 bgcolor=#E9E9E9
| 328306 ||  || — || April 24, 2008 || Kitt Peak || Spacewatch || — || align=right data-sort-value="0.97" | 970 m || 
|-id=307 bgcolor=#E9E9E9
| 328307 ||  || — || April 26, 2008 || Kitt Peak || Spacewatch || — || align=right | 2.9 km || 
|-id=308 bgcolor=#E9E9E9
| 328308 ||  || — || April 26, 2008 || Kitt Peak || Spacewatch || — || align=right | 1.1 km || 
|-id=309 bgcolor=#E9E9E9
| 328309 ||  || — || April 26, 2008 || Catalina || CSS || — || align=right | 2.6 km || 
|-id=310 bgcolor=#E9E9E9
| 328310 ||  || — || April 26, 2008 || Mount Lemmon || Mount Lemmon Survey || BAR || align=right | 1.5 km || 
|-id=311 bgcolor=#E9E9E9
| 328311 ||  || — || April 29, 2008 || Mount Lemmon || Mount Lemmon Survey || — || align=right | 1.2 km || 
|-id=312 bgcolor=#E9E9E9
| 328312 ||  || — || April 25, 2008 || Kitt Peak || Spacewatch || — || align=right data-sort-value="0.89" | 890 m || 
|-id=313 bgcolor=#E9E9E9
| 328313 ||  || — || April 30, 2008 || Kitt Peak || Spacewatch || — || align=right | 1.7 km || 
|-id=314 bgcolor=#E9E9E9
| 328314 ||  || — || April 29, 2008 || Kitt Peak || Spacewatch || — || align=right | 1.7 km || 
|-id=315 bgcolor=#E9E9E9
| 328315 ||  || — || April 29, 2008 || Kitt Peak || Spacewatch || ADE || align=right | 1.9 km || 
|-id=316 bgcolor=#E9E9E9
| 328316 ||  || — || April 30, 2008 || Kitt Peak || Spacewatch || AER || align=right | 1.6 km || 
|-id=317 bgcolor=#E9E9E9
| 328317 ||  || — || April 30, 2008 || Mount Lemmon || Mount Lemmon Survey || — || align=right | 1.0 km || 
|-id=318 bgcolor=#E9E9E9
| 328318 ||  || — || April 30, 2008 || Kitt Peak || Spacewatch || MAR || align=right | 1.1 km || 
|-id=319 bgcolor=#E9E9E9
| 328319 ||  || — || April 6, 2008 || Kitt Peak || Spacewatch || — || align=right | 1.2 km || 
|-id=320 bgcolor=#E9E9E9
| 328320 ||  || — || May 3, 2008 || Mount Lemmon || Mount Lemmon Survey || — || align=right | 1.2 km || 
|-id=321 bgcolor=#E9E9E9
| 328321 ||  || — || May 3, 2008 || Mount Lemmon || Mount Lemmon Survey || — || align=right data-sort-value="0.80" | 800 m || 
|-id=322 bgcolor=#E9E9E9
| 328322 ||  || — || May 6, 2008 || Mount Lemmon || Mount Lemmon Survey || — || align=right | 1.6 km || 
|-id=323 bgcolor=#E9E9E9
| 328323 ||  || — || May 7, 2008 || Desert Eagle || W. K. Y. Yeung || — || align=right | 1.1 km || 
|-id=324 bgcolor=#E9E9E9
| 328324 ||  || — || May 2, 2008 || Kitt Peak || Spacewatch || — || align=right | 1.6 km || 
|-id=325 bgcolor=#E9E9E9
| 328325 ||  || — || May 3, 2008 || Kitt Peak || Spacewatch || — || align=right data-sort-value="0.76" | 760 m || 
|-id=326 bgcolor=#fefefe
| 328326 ||  || — || May 7, 2008 || Mount Lemmon || Mount Lemmon Survey || — || align=right data-sort-value="0.89" | 890 m || 
|-id=327 bgcolor=#E9E9E9
| 328327 ||  || — || May 8, 2008 || Kitt Peak || Spacewatch || — || align=right | 1.2 km || 
|-id=328 bgcolor=#E9E9E9
| 328328 ||  || — || May 13, 2008 || Mount Lemmon || Mount Lemmon Survey || BAR || align=right | 1.5 km || 
|-id=329 bgcolor=#E9E9E9
| 328329 ||  || — || May 8, 2008 || Kitt Peak || Spacewatch || — || align=right | 1.7 km || 
|-id=330 bgcolor=#E9E9E9
| 328330 ||  || — || May 8, 2008 || Kitt Peak || Spacewatch || — || align=right | 2.1 km || 
|-id=331 bgcolor=#E9E9E9
| 328331 ||  || — || May 11, 2008 || Kitt Peak || Spacewatch || — || align=right | 2.9 km || 
|-id=332 bgcolor=#E9E9E9
| 328332 ||  || — || May 5, 2008 || Mount Lemmon || Mount Lemmon Survey || — || align=right | 1.4 km || 
|-id=333 bgcolor=#E9E9E9
| 328333 ||  || — || May 14, 2008 || Catalina || CSS || — || align=right | 1.5 km || 
|-id=334 bgcolor=#E9E9E9
| 328334 ||  || — || May 15, 2008 || Kitt Peak || Spacewatch || — || align=right | 1.4 km || 
|-id=335 bgcolor=#E9E9E9
| 328335 ||  || — || May 1, 2008 || Kitt Peak || Spacewatch || MIT || align=right | 4.1 km || 
|-id=336 bgcolor=#E9E9E9
| 328336 ||  || — || May 3, 2008 || Kitt Peak || Spacewatch || — || align=right | 1.1 km || 
|-id=337 bgcolor=#E9E9E9
| 328337 ||  || — || May 3, 2008 || Kitt Peak || Spacewatch || — || align=right | 1.3 km || 
|-id=338 bgcolor=#E9E9E9
| 328338 ||  || — || May 3, 2008 || Kitt Peak || Spacewatch || — || align=right | 1.1 km || 
|-id=339 bgcolor=#E9E9E9
| 328339 ||  || — || May 26, 2008 || Kitt Peak || Spacewatch || — || align=right | 1.0 km || 
|-id=340 bgcolor=#E9E9E9
| 328340 ||  || — || May 26, 2008 || Kitt Peak || Spacewatch || WIT || align=right | 1.2 km || 
|-id=341 bgcolor=#E9E9E9
| 328341 ||  || — || May 27, 2008 || Kitt Peak || Spacewatch || PAD || align=right | 1.8 km || 
|-id=342 bgcolor=#E9E9E9
| 328342 ||  || — || May 26, 2008 || Kitt Peak || Spacewatch || RAF || align=right data-sort-value="0.95" | 950 m || 
|-id=343 bgcolor=#E9E9E9
| 328343 ||  || — || April 30, 2008 || Mount Lemmon || Mount Lemmon Survey || — || align=right | 1.4 km || 
|-id=344 bgcolor=#E9E9E9
| 328344 ||  || — || May 27, 2008 || Mount Lemmon || Mount Lemmon Survey || — || align=right data-sort-value="0.78" | 780 m || 
|-id=345 bgcolor=#E9E9E9
| 328345 ||  || — || May 27, 2008 || Kitt Peak || Spacewatch || — || align=right data-sort-value="0.87" | 870 m || 
|-id=346 bgcolor=#E9E9E9
| 328346 ||  || — || May 27, 2008 || Kitt Peak || Spacewatch || EUN || align=right | 1.6 km || 
|-id=347 bgcolor=#E9E9E9
| 328347 ||  || — || May 28, 2008 || Kitt Peak || Spacewatch || — || align=right | 1.5 km || 
|-id=348 bgcolor=#E9E9E9
| 328348 ||  || — || May 29, 2008 || Kitt Peak || Spacewatch || — || align=right | 2.7 km || 
|-id=349 bgcolor=#E9E9E9
| 328349 ||  || — || May 30, 2008 || Kitt Peak || Spacewatch || MAR || align=right data-sort-value="0.80" | 800 m || 
|-id=350 bgcolor=#E9E9E9
| 328350 ||  || — || June 1, 2008 || Kitt Peak || Spacewatch || MAR || align=right | 1.2 km || 
|-id=351 bgcolor=#E9E9E9
| 328351 ||  || — || June 1, 2008 || Kitt Peak || Spacewatch || — || align=right | 2.1 km || 
|-id=352 bgcolor=#E9E9E9
| 328352 ||  || — || June 4, 2008 || Kitt Peak || Spacewatch || JUN || align=right | 1.3 km || 
|-id=353 bgcolor=#E9E9E9
| 328353 ||  || — || June 4, 2008 || Kitt Peak || Spacewatch || BRG || align=right | 2.1 km || 
|-id=354 bgcolor=#E9E9E9
| 328354 ||  || — || June 9, 2008 || Kitt Peak || Spacewatch || — || align=right | 2.4 km || 
|-id=355 bgcolor=#E9E9E9
| 328355 ||  || — || June 7, 2008 || Kitt Peak || Spacewatch || — || align=right | 2.4 km || 
|-id=356 bgcolor=#E9E9E9
| 328356 ||  || — || June 27, 2008 || La Sagra || OAM Obs. || JUN || align=right | 1.7 km || 
|-id=357 bgcolor=#d6d6d6
| 328357 ||  || — || June 14, 2008 || Kitt Peak || Spacewatch || 628 || align=right | 2.2 km || 
|-id=358 bgcolor=#E9E9E9
| 328358 ||  || — || July 28, 2008 || Črni Vrh || Črni Vrh || — || align=right | 3.4 km || 
|-id=359 bgcolor=#E9E9E9
| 328359 ||  || — || July 26, 2008 || Siding Spring || SSS || CLO || align=right | 2.8 km || 
|-id=360 bgcolor=#E9E9E9
| 328360 ||  || — || July 28, 2008 || Črni Vrh || Črni Vrh || — || align=right | 2.9 km || 
|-id=361 bgcolor=#d6d6d6
| 328361 ||  || — || July 29, 2008 || Socorro || LINEAR || — || align=right | 4.6 km || 
|-id=362 bgcolor=#E9E9E9
| 328362 ||  || — || July 29, 2008 || Socorro || LINEAR || — || align=right | 3.6 km || 
|-id=363 bgcolor=#d6d6d6
| 328363 ||  || — || July 29, 2008 || Kitt Peak || Spacewatch || — || align=right | 3.8 km || 
|-id=364 bgcolor=#d6d6d6
| 328364 ||  || — || July 30, 2008 || Mount Lemmon || Mount Lemmon Survey || — || align=right | 3.6 km || 
|-id=365 bgcolor=#E9E9E9
| 328365 ||  || — || August 5, 2008 || Skylive Obs. || F. Tozzi || — || align=right | 3.3 km || 
|-id=366 bgcolor=#d6d6d6
| 328366 ||  || — || August 7, 2008 || Kitt Peak || Spacewatch || — || align=right | 3.9 km || 
|-id=367 bgcolor=#d6d6d6
| 328367 ||  || — || August 25, 2008 || Hibiscus || S. F. Hönig, N. Teamo || — || align=right | 4.0 km || 
|-id=368 bgcolor=#d6d6d6
| 328368 ||  || — || August 26, 2008 || La Sagra || OAM Obs. || — || align=right | 3.4 km || 
|-id=369 bgcolor=#d6d6d6
| 328369 ||  || — || August 28, 2008 || Hibiscus || S. F. Hönig, N. Teamo || — || align=right | 3.8 km || 
|-id=370 bgcolor=#d6d6d6
| 328370 ||  || — || August 27, 2008 || Vicques || M. Ory || EOS || align=right | 2.3 km || 
|-id=371 bgcolor=#d6d6d6
| 328371 ||  || — || August 28, 2008 || Dauban || F. Kugel || — || align=right | 4.4 km || 
|-id=372 bgcolor=#E9E9E9
| 328372 ||  || — || August 27, 2008 || Kleť || Kleť Obs. || — || align=right | 2.0 km || 
|-id=373 bgcolor=#d6d6d6
| 328373 ||  || — || August 26, 2008 || Socorro || LINEAR || — || align=right | 4.3 km || 
|-id=374 bgcolor=#E9E9E9
| 328374 ||  || — || July 29, 2008 || Kitt Peak || Spacewatch || DOR || align=right | 2.4 km || 
|-id=375 bgcolor=#d6d6d6
| 328375 ||  || — || August 30, 2008 || La Sagra || OAM Obs. || — || align=right | 4.6 km || 
|-id=376 bgcolor=#d6d6d6
| 328376 ||  || — || August 30, 2008 || La Sagra || OAM Obs. || EMA || align=right | 6.1 km || 
|-id=377 bgcolor=#d6d6d6
| 328377 ||  || — || August 30, 2008 || Socorro || LINEAR || EUP || align=right | 3.3 km || 
|-id=378 bgcolor=#d6d6d6
| 328378 ||  || — || September 3, 2008 || Kitt Peak || Spacewatch || — || align=right | 3.9 km || 
|-id=379 bgcolor=#d6d6d6
| 328379 ||  || — || September 2, 2008 || Kitt Peak || Spacewatch || — || align=right | 5.6 km || 
|-id=380 bgcolor=#d6d6d6
| 328380 ||  || — || September 2, 2008 || Kitt Peak || Spacewatch || — || align=right | 2.6 km || 
|-id=381 bgcolor=#C2FFFF
| 328381 ||  || — || September 2, 2008 || Kitt Peak || Spacewatch || L4ERY || align=right | 7.9 km || 
|-id=382 bgcolor=#d6d6d6
| 328382 ||  || — || September 2, 2008 || Kitt Peak || Spacewatch || — || align=right | 3.2 km || 
|-id=383 bgcolor=#d6d6d6
| 328383 ||  || — || September 3, 2008 || Kitt Peak || Spacewatch || — || align=right | 3.8 km || 
|-id=384 bgcolor=#d6d6d6
| 328384 ||  || — || September 4, 2008 || Kitt Peak || Spacewatch || — || align=right | 4.1 km || 
|-id=385 bgcolor=#d6d6d6
| 328385 ||  || — || September 6, 2008 || Catalina || CSS || — || align=right | 3.1 km || 
|-id=386 bgcolor=#d6d6d6
| 328386 ||  || — || September 4, 2008 || Kitt Peak || Spacewatch || — || align=right | 2.6 km || 
|-id=387 bgcolor=#d6d6d6
| 328387 ||  || — || September 5, 2008 || Kitt Peak || Spacewatch || — || align=right | 5.2 km || 
|-id=388 bgcolor=#d6d6d6
| 328388 ||  || — || September 7, 2008 || Mount Lemmon || Mount Lemmon Survey || — || align=right | 3.1 km || 
|-id=389 bgcolor=#E9E9E9
| 328389 ||  || — || September 7, 2008 || Siding Spring || SSS || — || align=right | 2.5 km || 
|-id=390 bgcolor=#d6d6d6
| 328390 ||  || — || September 2, 2008 || Kitt Peak || Spacewatch || — || align=right | 4.1 km || 
|-id=391 bgcolor=#d6d6d6
| 328391 ||  || — || September 6, 2008 || Catalina || CSS || HYG || align=right | 4.3 km || 
|-id=392 bgcolor=#d6d6d6
| 328392 ||  || — || September 5, 2008 || Kitt Peak || Spacewatch || — || align=right | 3.3 km || 
|-id=393 bgcolor=#d6d6d6
| 328393 ||  || — || September 10, 2008 || Siding Spring || SSS || EUP || align=right | 5.2 km || 
|-id=394 bgcolor=#d6d6d6
| 328394 ||  || — || September 6, 2008 || Mount Lemmon || Mount Lemmon Survey || — || align=right | 2.9 km || 
|-id=395 bgcolor=#d6d6d6
| 328395 ||  || — || September 7, 2008 || Catalina || CSS || — || align=right | 7.1 km || 
|-id=396 bgcolor=#d6d6d6
| 328396 ||  || — || September 7, 2008 || Catalina || CSS || — || align=right | 3.9 km || 
|-id=397 bgcolor=#d6d6d6
| 328397 ||  || — || September 7, 2008 || Socorro || LINEAR || — || align=right | 5.6 km || 
|-id=398 bgcolor=#d6d6d6
| 328398 ||  || — || September 5, 2008 || Kitt Peak || Spacewatch || — || align=right | 2.9 km || 
|-id=399 bgcolor=#E9E9E9
| 328399 ||  || — || September 22, 2008 || Socorro || LINEAR || — || align=right | 3.8 km || 
|-id=400 bgcolor=#d6d6d6
| 328400 ||  || — || September 6, 2008 || Mount Lemmon || Mount Lemmon Survey || SAN || align=right | 1.8 km || 
|}

328401–328500 

|-bgcolor=#d6d6d6
| 328401 ||  || — || September 20, 2008 || Kitt Peak || Spacewatch || — || align=right | 3.9 km || 
|-id=402 bgcolor=#d6d6d6
| 328402 ||  || — || August 21, 2008 || Kitt Peak || Spacewatch || HYG || align=right | 3.6 km || 
|-id=403 bgcolor=#d6d6d6
| 328403 ||  || — || September 20, 2008 || Kitt Peak || Spacewatch || — || align=right | 3.7 km || 
|-id=404 bgcolor=#d6d6d6
| 328404 ||  || — || September 20, 2008 || Mount Lemmon || Mount Lemmon Survey || SYL7:4 || align=right | 4.3 km || 
|-id=405 bgcolor=#d6d6d6
| 328405 ||  || — || September 20, 2008 || Mount Lemmon || Mount Lemmon Survey || — || align=right | 3.0 km || 
|-id=406 bgcolor=#d6d6d6
| 328406 ||  || — || September 20, 2008 || Mount Lemmon || Mount Lemmon Survey || — || align=right | 2.8 km || 
|-id=407 bgcolor=#d6d6d6
| 328407 ||  || — || September 20, 2008 || Črni Vrh || Črni Vrh || — || align=right | 5.1 km || 
|-id=408 bgcolor=#d6d6d6
| 328408 ||  || — || September 21, 2008 || Kitt Peak || Spacewatch || HYG || align=right | 3.4 km || 
|-id=409 bgcolor=#d6d6d6
| 328409 ||  || — || October 3, 2003 || Kitt Peak || Spacewatch || — || align=right | 2.6 km || 
|-id=410 bgcolor=#d6d6d6
| 328410 ||  || — || September 23, 2008 || Mount Lemmon || Mount Lemmon Survey || — || align=right | 2.4 km || 
|-id=411 bgcolor=#d6d6d6
| 328411 ||  || — || September 21, 2008 || Mount Lemmon || Mount Lemmon Survey || — || align=right | 3.1 km || 
|-id=412 bgcolor=#d6d6d6
| 328412 ||  || — || September 21, 2008 || Mount Lemmon || Mount Lemmon Survey || — || align=right | 3.0 km || 
|-id=413 bgcolor=#d6d6d6
| 328413 ||  || — || September 21, 2008 || Catalina || CSS || ALA || align=right | 4.3 km || 
|-id=414 bgcolor=#d6d6d6
| 328414 ||  || — || September 22, 2008 || Kitt Peak || Spacewatch || 3:2 || align=right | 4.8 km || 
|-id=415 bgcolor=#d6d6d6
| 328415 ||  || — || September 24, 2008 || Socorro || LINEAR || EOS || align=right | 2.2 km || 
|-id=416 bgcolor=#d6d6d6
| 328416 ||  || — || September 24, 2008 || Socorro || LINEAR || — || align=right | 5.1 km || 
|-id=417 bgcolor=#d6d6d6
| 328417 ||  || — || September 28, 2008 || Socorro || LINEAR || — || align=right | 3.2 km || 
|-id=418 bgcolor=#E9E9E9
| 328418 ||  || — || September 28, 2008 || Socorro || LINEAR || TIN || align=right | 1.0 km || 
|-id=419 bgcolor=#d6d6d6
| 328419 ||  || — || September 22, 2008 || Catalina || CSS || INA || align=right | 3.4 km || 
|-id=420 bgcolor=#d6d6d6
| 328420 ||  || — || September 6, 2008 || Kitt Peak || Spacewatch || 7:4 || align=right | 2.9 km || 
|-id=421 bgcolor=#d6d6d6
| 328421 ||  || — || September 29, 2008 || Goodricke-Pigott || R. A. Tucker || HYG || align=right | 3.7 km || 
|-id=422 bgcolor=#d6d6d6
| 328422 ||  || — || September 24, 2008 || Kitt Peak || Spacewatch || THM || align=right | 2.6 km || 
|-id=423 bgcolor=#d6d6d6
| 328423 ||  || — || September 21, 2008 || Catalina || CSS || MEL || align=right | 5.9 km || 
|-id=424 bgcolor=#d6d6d6
| 328424 ||  || — || September 25, 2008 || Kitt Peak || Spacewatch || — || align=right | 3.8 km || 
|-id=425 bgcolor=#d6d6d6
| 328425 ||  || — || September 26, 2008 || Kitt Peak || Spacewatch || SYL7:4 || align=right | 5.8 km || 
|-id=426 bgcolor=#d6d6d6
| 328426 ||  || — || September 24, 2008 || Mount Lemmon || Mount Lemmon Survey || — || align=right | 2.3 km || 
|-id=427 bgcolor=#d6d6d6
| 328427 ||  || — || September 21, 2008 || Catalina || CSS || LIX || align=right | 4.7 km || 
|-id=428 bgcolor=#d6d6d6
| 328428 ||  || — || October 22, 2003 || Apache Point || SDSS || — || align=right | 4.2 km || 
|-id=429 bgcolor=#d6d6d6
| 328429 ||  || — || September 22, 2008 || Kitt Peak || Spacewatch || — || align=right | 3.5 km || 
|-id=430 bgcolor=#d6d6d6
| 328430 ||  || — || October 1, 2008 || La Sagra || OAM Obs. || — || align=right | 3.4 km || 
|-id=431 bgcolor=#d6d6d6
| 328431 ||  || — || October 1, 2008 || La Sagra || OAM Obs. || — || align=right | 3.3 km || 
|-id=432 bgcolor=#d6d6d6
| 328432 Thomasposch ||  ||  || October 7, 2008 || Altschwendt || W. Ries || — || align=right | 3.4 km || 
|-id=433 bgcolor=#d6d6d6
| 328433 ||  || — || October 1, 2008 || Mount Lemmon || Mount Lemmon Survey || ELF || align=right | 5.2 km || 
|-id=434 bgcolor=#d6d6d6
| 328434 ||  || — || October 1, 2008 || Mount Lemmon || Mount Lemmon Survey || — || align=right | 4.0 km || 
|-id=435 bgcolor=#d6d6d6
| 328435 ||  || — || October 1, 2008 || Mount Lemmon || Mount Lemmon Survey || — || align=right | 3.6 km || 
|-id=436 bgcolor=#d6d6d6
| 328436 ||  || — || October 1, 2008 || Mount Lemmon || Mount Lemmon Survey || THM || align=right | 2.4 km || 
|-id=437 bgcolor=#d6d6d6
| 328437 ||  || — || October 2, 2008 || Catalina || CSS || TIR || align=right | 3.3 km || 
|-id=438 bgcolor=#d6d6d6
| 328438 ||  || — || October 1, 2008 || Kitt Peak || Spacewatch || HYG || align=right | 3.2 km || 
|-id=439 bgcolor=#d6d6d6
| 328439 ||  || — || October 1, 2008 || Kitt Peak || Spacewatch || — || align=right | 4.4 km || 
|-id=440 bgcolor=#d6d6d6
| 328440 ||  || — || October 1, 2008 || Mount Lemmon || Mount Lemmon Survey || SYL7:4 || align=right | 4.5 km || 
|-id=441 bgcolor=#d6d6d6
| 328441 ||  || — || October 2, 2008 || Kitt Peak || Spacewatch || — || align=right | 2.9 km || 
|-id=442 bgcolor=#d6d6d6
| 328442 ||  || — || October 2, 2008 || Kitt Peak || Spacewatch || 3:2 || align=right | 4.2 km || 
|-id=443 bgcolor=#d6d6d6
| 328443 ||  || — || October 2, 2008 || Kitt Peak || Spacewatch || 7:4 || align=right | 4.9 km || 
|-id=444 bgcolor=#d6d6d6
| 328444 ||  || — || October 2, 2008 || Kitt Peak || Spacewatch || MEL || align=right | 3.6 km || 
|-id=445 bgcolor=#d6d6d6
| 328445 ||  || — || October 2, 2008 || Kitt Peak || Spacewatch || 3:2 || align=right | 6.8 km || 
|-id=446 bgcolor=#d6d6d6
| 328446 ||  || — || October 3, 2008 || Kitt Peak || Spacewatch || LIX || align=right | 5.9 km || 
|-id=447 bgcolor=#d6d6d6
| 328447 ||  || — || October 4, 2008 || La Sagra || OAM Obs. || — || align=right | 2.8 km || 
|-id=448 bgcolor=#d6d6d6
| 328448 ||  || — || October 6, 2008 || Mount Lemmon || Mount Lemmon Survey || — || align=right | 5.5 km || 
|-id=449 bgcolor=#d6d6d6
| 328449 ||  || — || October 6, 2008 || Catalina || CSS || — || align=right | 4.6 km || 
|-id=450 bgcolor=#d6d6d6
| 328450 ||  || — || October 6, 2008 || Catalina || CSS || — || align=right | 3.2 km || 
|-id=451 bgcolor=#d6d6d6
| 328451 ||  || — || October 6, 2008 || Kitt Peak || Spacewatch || 3:2 || align=right | 7.7 km || 
|-id=452 bgcolor=#d6d6d6
| 328452 ||  || — || October 7, 2008 || Catalina || CSS || URS || align=right | 4.2 km || 
|-id=453 bgcolor=#d6d6d6
| 328453 ||  || — || October 9, 2008 || Mount Lemmon || Mount Lemmon Survey || EUP || align=right | 4.3 km || 
|-id=454 bgcolor=#d6d6d6
| 328454 ||  || — || October 10, 2008 || Mount Lemmon || Mount Lemmon Survey || 3:2 || align=right | 5.2 km || 
|-id=455 bgcolor=#d6d6d6
| 328455 ||  || — || March 9, 2005 || Mount Lemmon || Mount Lemmon Survey || — || align=right | 3.4 km || 
|-id=456 bgcolor=#d6d6d6
| 328456 ||  || — || October 24, 2008 || Socorro || LINEAR || — || align=right | 3.4 km || 
|-id=457 bgcolor=#d6d6d6
| 328457 ||  || — || October 26, 2008 || Socorro || LINEAR || EUP || align=right | 5.0 km || 
|-id=458 bgcolor=#d6d6d6
| 328458 ||  || — || October 21, 2008 || Kitt Peak || Spacewatch || — || align=right | 2.7 km || 
|-id=459 bgcolor=#d6d6d6
| 328459 ||  || — || October 21, 2008 || Kitt Peak || Spacewatch || — || align=right | 4.0 km || 
|-id=460 bgcolor=#d6d6d6
| 328460 ||  || — || October 22, 2008 || Kitt Peak || Spacewatch || — || align=right | 4.2 km || 
|-id=461 bgcolor=#d6d6d6
| 328461 ||  || — || October 23, 2008 || Kitt Peak || Spacewatch || Tj (2.99) || align=right | 4.4 km || 
|-id=462 bgcolor=#d6d6d6
| 328462 ||  || — || October 25, 2008 || Mount Lemmon || Mount Lemmon Survey || — || align=right | 2.8 km || 
|-id=463 bgcolor=#d6d6d6
| 328463 ||  || — || October 7, 2008 || Catalina || CSS || — || align=right | 3.4 km || 
|-id=464 bgcolor=#d6d6d6
| 328464 ||  || — || October 25, 2008 || Catalina || CSS || Tj (2.95) || align=right | 5.3 km || 
|-id=465 bgcolor=#d6d6d6
| 328465 ||  || — || November 1, 2008 || Mount Lemmon || Mount Lemmon Survey || THB || align=right | 4.7 km || 
|-id=466 bgcolor=#d6d6d6
| 328466 ||  || — || November 2, 2008 || Kitt Peak || Spacewatch || THM || align=right | 2.8 km || 
|-id=467 bgcolor=#d6d6d6
| 328467 ||  || — || November 17, 2008 || Kitt Peak || Spacewatch || EUP || align=right | 4.2 km || 
|-id=468 bgcolor=#FA8072
| 328468 ||  || — || December 30, 2008 || Kitt Peak || Spacewatch || H || align=right | 1.0 km || 
|-id=469 bgcolor=#FA8072
| 328469 ||  || — || January 25, 2009 || Kitt Peak || Spacewatch || H || align=right data-sort-value="0.72" | 720 m || 
|-id=470 bgcolor=#fefefe
| 328470 ||  || — || February 4, 2009 || Bisei SG Center || BATTeRS || H || align=right data-sort-value="0.65" | 650 m || 
|-id=471 bgcolor=#fefefe
| 328471 ||  || — || February 3, 2009 || Mount Lemmon || Mount Lemmon Survey || H || align=right data-sort-value="0.69" | 690 m || 
|-id=472 bgcolor=#fefefe
| 328472 ||  || — || February 25, 2009 || Tzec Maun || F. Tozzi || H || align=right data-sort-value="0.73" | 730 m || 
|-id=473 bgcolor=#fefefe
| 328473 ||  || — || March 24, 2009 || Catalina || CSS || H || align=right data-sort-value="0.74" | 740 m || 
|-id=474 bgcolor=#fefefe
| 328474 ||  || — || March 26, 2009 || Kitt Peak || Spacewatch || — || align=right data-sort-value="0.89" | 890 m || 
|-id=475 bgcolor=#d6d6d6
| 328475 ||  || — || April 17, 2009 || Mount Lemmon || Mount Lemmon Survey || — || align=right | 4.6 km || 
|-id=476 bgcolor=#fefefe
| 328476 ||  || — || July 24, 2003 || Palomar || NEAT || — || align=right data-sort-value="0.68" | 680 m || 
|-id=477 bgcolor=#fefefe
| 328477 Eckstein ||  ||  || April 21, 2009 || Tzec Maun || E. Schwab || MAS || align=right data-sort-value="0.60" | 600 m || 
|-id=478 bgcolor=#fefefe
| 328478 ||  || — || April 22, 2009 || Kitt Peak || Spacewatch || — || align=right data-sort-value="0.88" | 880 m || 
|-id=479 bgcolor=#fefefe
| 328479 ||  || — || April 18, 2009 || Kitt Peak || Spacewatch || — || align=right data-sort-value="0.96" | 960 m || 
|-id=480 bgcolor=#fefefe
| 328480 ||  || — || November 9, 2007 || Kitt Peak || Spacewatch || FLO || align=right data-sort-value="0.62" | 620 m || 
|-id=481 bgcolor=#fefefe
| 328481 ||  || — || May 26, 2009 || Kitt Peak || Spacewatch || — || align=right data-sort-value="0.85" | 850 m || 
|-id=482 bgcolor=#fefefe
| 328482 ||  || — || November 19, 2007 || Mount Lemmon || Mount Lemmon Survey || — || align=right data-sort-value="0.79" | 790 m || 
|-id=483 bgcolor=#fefefe
| 328483 ||  || — || June 15, 2009 || Mount Lemmon || Mount Lemmon Survey || critical || align=right data-sort-value="0.59" | 590 m || 
|-id=484 bgcolor=#fefefe
| 328484 ||  || — || June 21, 2009 || Kitt Peak || Spacewatch || — || align=right data-sort-value="0.97" | 970 m || 
|-id=485 bgcolor=#FA8072
| 328485 ||  || — || June 21, 2009 || Catalina || CSS || — || align=right data-sort-value="0.62" | 620 m || 
|-id=486 bgcolor=#fefefe
| 328486 ||  || — || April 18, 2002 || Kitt Peak || Spacewatch || — || align=right data-sort-value="0.78" | 780 m || 
|-id=487 bgcolor=#fefefe
| 328487 ||  || — || June 28, 2009 || La Sagra || OAM Obs. || NYS || align=right data-sort-value="0.97" | 970 m || 
|-id=488 bgcolor=#fefefe
| 328488 ||  || — || June 24, 2009 || Mount Lemmon || Mount Lemmon Survey || NYS || align=right data-sort-value="0.72" | 720 m || 
|-id=489 bgcolor=#fefefe
| 328489 ||  || — || July 17, 2009 || Hibiscus || N. Teamo || — || align=right data-sort-value="0.65" | 650 m || 
|-id=490 bgcolor=#fefefe
| 328490 ||  || — || July 19, 2009 || La Sagra || OAM Obs. || — || align=right | 1.3 km || 
|-id=491 bgcolor=#fefefe
| 328491 ||  || — || July 23, 2009 || Tiki || N. Teamo || FLO || align=right data-sort-value="0.65" | 650 m || 
|-id=492 bgcolor=#fefefe
| 328492 ||  || — || July 19, 2009 || La Sagra || OAM Obs. || — || align=right | 1.1 km || 
|-id=493 bgcolor=#E9E9E9
| 328493 ||  || — || July 28, 2009 || Kitt Peak || Spacewatch || — || align=right | 1.5 km || 
|-id=494 bgcolor=#fefefe
| 328494 ||  || — || July 25, 2009 || La Sagra || OAM Obs. || ERI || align=right | 2.0 km || 
|-id=495 bgcolor=#fefefe
| 328495 ||  || — || July 26, 2009 || La Sagra || OAM Obs. || NYS || align=right data-sort-value="0.88" | 880 m || 
|-id=496 bgcolor=#fefefe
| 328496 ||  || — || August 12, 2009 || La Sagra || OAM Obs. || V || align=right data-sort-value="0.82" | 820 m || 
|-id=497 bgcolor=#d6d6d6
| 328497 ||  || — || July 29, 2009 || Catalina || CSS || BRA || align=right | 2.3 km || 
|-id=498 bgcolor=#fefefe
| 328498 ||  || — || August 15, 2009 || Catalina || CSS || — || align=right data-sort-value="0.80" | 800 m || 
|-id=499 bgcolor=#fefefe
| 328499 ||  || — || August 15, 2009 || Kitt Peak || Spacewatch || NYS || align=right data-sort-value="0.72" | 720 m || 
|-id=500 bgcolor=#fefefe
| 328500 ||  || — || August 15, 2009 || Kitt Peak || Spacewatch || FLO || align=right data-sort-value="0.53" | 530 m || 
|}

328501–328600 

|-bgcolor=#fefefe
| 328501 ||  || — || August 15, 2009 || Kitt Peak || Spacewatch || — || align=right | 1.2 km || 
|-id=502 bgcolor=#fefefe
| 328502 ||  || — || August 15, 2009 || Needville || J. Dellinger, C. Sexton || FLO || align=right data-sort-value="0.83" | 830 m || 
|-id=503 bgcolor=#fefefe
| 328503 ||  || — || August 15, 2009 || Catalina || CSS || MAS || align=right data-sort-value="0.73" | 730 m || 
|-id=504 bgcolor=#E9E9E9
| 328504 ||  || — || August 15, 2009 || Kitt Peak || Spacewatch || WIT || align=right | 1.2 km || 
|-id=505 bgcolor=#E9E9E9
| 328505 ||  || — || August 15, 2009 || Kitt Peak || Spacewatch || — || align=right | 2.0 km || 
|-id=506 bgcolor=#d6d6d6
| 328506 ||  || — || August 15, 2009 || Kitt Peak || Spacewatch || KOR || align=right | 1.4 km || 
|-id=507 bgcolor=#d6d6d6
| 328507 ||  || — || August 18, 2009 || Bergisch Gladbach || W. Bickel || VER || align=right | 3.4 km || 
|-id=508 bgcolor=#FA8072
| 328508 ||  || — || August 21, 2009 || La Sagra || OAM Obs. || — || align=right data-sort-value="0.75" | 750 m || 
|-id=509 bgcolor=#fefefe
| 328509 ||  || — || August 21, 2009 || Andrushivka || Andrushivka Obs. || MAS || align=right | 1.00 km || 
|-id=510 bgcolor=#fefefe
| 328510 ||  || — || August 22, 2009 || Dauban || F. Kugel || — || align=right data-sort-value="0.93" | 930 m || 
|-id=511 bgcolor=#fefefe
| 328511 ||  || — || August 18, 2009 || Kitt Peak || Spacewatch || — || align=right data-sort-value="0.86" | 860 m || 
|-id=512 bgcolor=#fefefe
| 328512 ||  || — || August 16, 2009 || La Sagra || OAM Obs. || NYS || align=right data-sort-value="0.67" | 670 m || 
|-id=513 bgcolor=#fefefe
| 328513 ||  || — || August 16, 2009 || Kitt Peak || Spacewatch || NYS || align=right data-sort-value="0.73" | 730 m || 
|-id=514 bgcolor=#fefefe
| 328514 ||  || — || August 16, 2009 || Kitt Peak || Spacewatch || MAS || align=right data-sort-value="0.79" | 790 m || 
|-id=515 bgcolor=#fefefe
| 328515 ||  || — || August 19, 2009 || La Sagra || OAM Obs. || — || align=right data-sort-value="0.80" | 800 m || 
|-id=516 bgcolor=#fefefe
| 328516 ||  || — || August 19, 2009 || La Sagra || OAM Obs. || — || align=right | 1.1 km || 
|-id=517 bgcolor=#fefefe
| 328517 ||  || — || August 19, 2009 || Bergisch Gladbac || W. Bickel || — || align=right data-sort-value="0.86" | 860 m || 
|-id=518 bgcolor=#fefefe
| 328518 ||  || — || August 20, 2009 || La Sagra || OAM Obs. || MAS || align=right data-sort-value="0.97" | 970 m || 
|-id=519 bgcolor=#fefefe
| 328519 ||  || — || August 16, 2009 || Catalina || CSS || — || align=right data-sort-value="0.88" | 880 m || 
|-id=520 bgcolor=#fefefe
| 328520 ||  || — || August 16, 2009 || Catalina || CSS || — || align=right | 1.0 km || 
|-id=521 bgcolor=#fefefe
| 328521 ||  || — || August 23, 2009 || La Sagra || OAM Obs. || ERI || align=right | 2.0 km || 
|-id=522 bgcolor=#E9E9E9
| 328522 ||  || — || August 31, 2009 || Bergisch Gladbac || W. Bickel || — || align=right | 1.2 km || 
|-id=523 bgcolor=#E9E9E9
| 328523 ||  || — || August 28, 2009 || La Sagra || OAM Obs. || — || align=right | 1.8 km || 
|-id=524 bgcolor=#fefefe
| 328524 ||  || — || August 17, 2009 || Siding Spring || SSS || PHO || align=right | 1.3 km || 
|-id=525 bgcolor=#d6d6d6
| 328525 ||  || — || August 17, 2009 || Kitt Peak || Spacewatch || — || align=right | 3.3 km || 
|-id=526 bgcolor=#E9E9E9
| 328526 ||  || — || August 18, 2009 || Kitt Peak || Spacewatch || — || align=right | 2.4 km || 
|-id=527 bgcolor=#E9E9E9
| 328527 ||  || — || August 16, 2009 || Kitt Peak || Spacewatch || — || align=right | 1.5 km || 
|-id=528 bgcolor=#d6d6d6
| 328528 ||  || — || August 17, 2009 || Kitt Peak || Spacewatch || — || align=right | 2.9 km || 
|-id=529 bgcolor=#fefefe
| 328529 ||  || — || August 28, 2009 || La Sagra || OAM Obs. || — || align=right | 1.0 km || 
|-id=530 bgcolor=#fefefe
| 328530 ||  || — || August 27, 2009 || Kitt Peak || Spacewatch || — || align=right data-sort-value="0.75" | 750 m || 
|-id=531 bgcolor=#E9E9E9
| 328531 ||  || — || September 13, 2009 || Bisei SG Center || BATTeRS || — || align=right | 1.7 km || 
|-id=532 bgcolor=#E9E9E9
| 328532 ||  || — || September 12, 2009 || Kitt Peak || Spacewatch || — || align=right | 2.4 km || 
|-id=533 bgcolor=#E9E9E9
| 328533 ||  || — || September 12, 2009 || Kitt Peak || Spacewatch || — || align=right | 2.7 km || 
|-id=534 bgcolor=#E9E9E9
| 328534 ||  || — || September 12, 2009 || Kitt Peak || Spacewatch || — || align=right | 2.6 km || 
|-id=535 bgcolor=#d6d6d6
| 328535 ||  || — || September 12, 2009 || Kitt Peak || Spacewatch || — || align=right | 2.7 km || 
|-id=536 bgcolor=#E9E9E9
| 328536 ||  || — || September 14, 2009 || Kitt Peak || Spacewatch || NEM || align=right | 2.2 km || 
|-id=537 bgcolor=#d6d6d6
| 328537 ||  || — || September 15, 2009 || Kitt Peak || Spacewatch || KOR || align=right | 1.2 km || 
|-id=538 bgcolor=#d6d6d6
| 328538 ||  || — || September 15, 2009 || Kitt Peak || Spacewatch || — || align=right | 4.0 km || 
|-id=539 bgcolor=#d6d6d6
| 328539 ||  || — || January 23, 2006 || Kitt Peak || Spacewatch || EOS || align=right | 2.6 km || 
|-id=540 bgcolor=#d6d6d6
| 328540 ||  || — || September 14, 2009 || Kitt Peak || Spacewatch || HYG || align=right | 2.8 km || 
|-id=541 bgcolor=#E9E9E9
| 328541 ||  || — || September 14, 2009 || Kitt Peak || Spacewatch || — || align=right | 2.1 km || 
|-id=542 bgcolor=#E9E9E9
| 328542 ||  || — || September 14, 2009 || Kitt Peak || Spacewatch || — || align=right | 2.2 km || 
|-id=543 bgcolor=#d6d6d6
| 328543 ||  || — || September 14, 2009 || Kitt Peak || Spacewatch || — || align=right | 3.8 km || 
|-id=544 bgcolor=#E9E9E9
| 328544 ||  || — || September 14, 2009 || Kitt Peak || Spacewatch || PAE || align=right | 2.8 km || 
|-id=545 bgcolor=#d6d6d6
| 328545 ||  || — || September 14, 2009 || Kitt Peak || Spacewatch || — || align=right | 4.5 km || 
|-id=546 bgcolor=#E9E9E9
| 328546 ||  || — || September 15, 2009 || Kitt Peak || Spacewatch || WIT || align=right | 1.2 km || 
|-id=547 bgcolor=#d6d6d6
| 328547 ||  || — || September 15, 2009 || Kitt Peak || Spacewatch || — || align=right | 4.0 km || 
|-id=548 bgcolor=#d6d6d6
| 328548 ||  || — || September 15, 2009 || Kitt Peak || Spacewatch || VER || align=right | 2.5 km || 
|-id=549 bgcolor=#d6d6d6
| 328549 ||  || — || September 15, 2009 || Kitt Peak || Spacewatch || KOR || align=right | 1.8 km || 
|-id=550 bgcolor=#d6d6d6
| 328550 ||  || — || September 15, 2009 || Kitt Peak || Spacewatch || — || align=right | 4.1 km || 
|-id=551 bgcolor=#E9E9E9
| 328551 ||  || — || September 15, 2009 || Kitt Peak || Spacewatch || HOF || align=right | 2.9 km || 
|-id=552 bgcolor=#E9E9E9
| 328552 ||  || — || September 14, 2009 || Catalina || CSS || AER || align=right | 1.7 km || 
|-id=553 bgcolor=#fefefe
| 328553 ||  || — || September 14, 2009 || Catalina || CSS || — || align=right | 1.1 km || 
|-id=554 bgcolor=#fefefe
| 328554 ||  || — || September 13, 2009 || Purple Mountain || PMO NEO || NYS || align=right data-sort-value="0.82" | 820 m || 
|-id=555 bgcolor=#fefefe
| 328555 ||  || — || September 15, 2009 || Mount Lemmon || Mount Lemmon Survey || — || align=right | 1.4 km || 
|-id=556 bgcolor=#E9E9E9
| 328556 ||  || — || September 15, 2009 || Kitt Peak || Spacewatch || RAF || align=right data-sort-value="0.69" | 690 m || 
|-id=557 bgcolor=#E9E9E9
| 328557 ||  || — || September 15, 2009 || Kitt Peak || Spacewatch || WIT || align=right | 1.1 km || 
|-id=558 bgcolor=#d6d6d6
| 328558 ||  || — || September 15, 2009 || Kitt Peak || Spacewatch || — || align=right | 2.6 km || 
|-id=559 bgcolor=#d6d6d6
| 328559 ||  || — || September 15, 2009 || Kitt Peak || Spacewatch || — || align=right | 3.5 km || 
|-id=560 bgcolor=#fefefe
| 328560 ||  || — || September 14, 2009 || Socorro || LINEAR || NYS || align=right data-sort-value="0.82" | 820 m || 
|-id=561 bgcolor=#fefefe
| 328561 ||  || — || August 15, 2009 || Catalina || CSS || NYS || align=right data-sort-value="0.74" | 740 m || 
|-id=562 bgcolor=#E9E9E9
| 328562 ||  || — || January 12, 2002 || Palomar || NEAT || — || align=right | 2.6 km || 
|-id=563 bgcolor=#FA8072
| 328563 Mosplanetarium ||  ||  || September 17, 2009 || Zelenchukskaya || T. V. Kryachko || — || align=right | 1.1 km || 
|-id=564 bgcolor=#E9E9E9
| 328564 ||  || — || September 16, 2009 || Mount Lemmon || Mount Lemmon Survey || GAL || align=right | 1.3 km || 
|-id=565 bgcolor=#fefefe
| 328565 ||  || — || September 16, 2009 || Mount Lemmon || Mount Lemmon Survey || NYS || align=right data-sort-value="0.68" | 680 m || 
|-id=566 bgcolor=#fefefe
| 328566 ||  || — || September 17, 2009 || Mount Lemmon || Mount Lemmon Survey || — || align=right data-sort-value="0.70" | 700 m || 
|-id=567 bgcolor=#d6d6d6
| 328567 ||  || — || September 16, 2009 || Kitt Peak || Spacewatch || — || align=right | 4.1 km || 
|-id=568 bgcolor=#d6d6d6
| 328568 ||  || — || September 21, 2009 || Altschwendt || W. Ries || KOR || align=right | 1.3 km || 
|-id=569 bgcolor=#fefefe
| 328569 ||  || — || September 16, 2009 || Kitt Peak || Spacewatch || FLO || align=right data-sort-value="0.58" | 580 m || 
|-id=570 bgcolor=#E9E9E9
| 328570 ||  || — || September 16, 2009 || Kitt Peak || Spacewatch || HEN || align=right | 1.0 km || 
|-id=571 bgcolor=#fefefe
| 328571 ||  || — || September 16, 2009 || Kitt Peak || Spacewatch || — || align=right data-sort-value="0.92" | 920 m || 
|-id=572 bgcolor=#d6d6d6
| 328572 ||  || — || September 16, 2009 || Kitt Peak || Spacewatch || — || align=right | 2.5 km || 
|-id=573 bgcolor=#E9E9E9
| 328573 ||  || — || September 16, 2009 || Kitt Peak || Spacewatch || — || align=right | 1.6 km || 
|-id=574 bgcolor=#E9E9E9
| 328574 ||  || — || September 16, 2009 || Kitt Peak || Spacewatch || — || align=right | 2.5 km || 
|-id=575 bgcolor=#E9E9E9
| 328575 ||  || — || November 5, 2005 || Kitt Peak || Spacewatch || — || align=right | 1.5 km || 
|-id=576 bgcolor=#E9E9E9
| 328576 ||  || — || September 16, 2009 || Kitt Peak || Spacewatch || — || align=right data-sort-value="0.85" | 850 m || 
|-id=577 bgcolor=#d6d6d6
| 328577 ||  || — || September 16, 2009 || Kitt Peak || Spacewatch || EOS || align=right | 2.2 km || 
|-id=578 bgcolor=#E9E9E9
| 328578 ||  || — || September 16, 2009 || Kitt Peak || Spacewatch || — || align=right | 1.0 km || 
|-id=579 bgcolor=#d6d6d6
| 328579 ||  || — || September 16, 2009 || Kitt Peak || Spacewatch || URS || align=right | 7.1 km || 
|-id=580 bgcolor=#d6d6d6
| 328580 ||  || — || September 16, 2009 || Kitt Peak || Spacewatch || KAR || align=right | 1.2 km || 
|-id=581 bgcolor=#d6d6d6
| 328581 ||  || — || September 16, 2009 || Kitt Peak || Spacewatch || — || align=right | 2.2 km || 
|-id=582 bgcolor=#d6d6d6
| 328582 ||  || — || September 16, 2009 || Kitt Peak || Spacewatch || — || align=right | 3.9 km || 
|-id=583 bgcolor=#E9E9E9
| 328583 ||  || — || September 16, 2009 || Mount Lemmon || Mount Lemmon Survey || — || align=right | 1.7 km || 
|-id=584 bgcolor=#E9E9E9
| 328584 ||  || — || September 16, 2009 || Kitt Peak || Spacewatch || — || align=right | 1.9 km || 
|-id=585 bgcolor=#E9E9E9
| 328585 ||  || — || September 16, 2009 || Kitt Peak || Spacewatch || — || align=right | 2.9 km || 
|-id=586 bgcolor=#E9E9E9
| 328586 ||  || — || September 17, 2009 || La Sagra || OAM Obs. || EUN || align=right | 1.6 km || 
|-id=587 bgcolor=#d6d6d6
| 328587 ||  || — || September 17, 2009 || Kitt Peak || Spacewatch || — || align=right | 3.1 km || 
|-id=588 bgcolor=#E9E9E9
| 328588 ||  || — || September 17, 2009 || Kitt Peak || Spacewatch || — || align=right | 3.1 km || 
|-id=589 bgcolor=#d6d6d6
| 328589 ||  || — || September 17, 2009 || Kitt Peak || Spacewatch || — || align=right | 2.7 km || 
|-id=590 bgcolor=#E9E9E9
| 328590 ||  || — || September 17, 2009 || Kitt Peak || Spacewatch || WIT || align=right | 1.4 km || 
|-id=591 bgcolor=#E9E9E9
| 328591 ||  || — || September 17, 2009 || Kitt Peak || Spacewatch || AGN || align=right | 1.5 km || 
|-id=592 bgcolor=#E9E9E9
| 328592 ||  || — || September 17, 2009 || Kitt Peak || Spacewatch || — || align=right | 2.1 km || 
|-id=593 bgcolor=#d6d6d6
| 328593 ||  || — || September 17, 2009 || Kitt Peak || Spacewatch || — || align=right | 3.8 km || 
|-id=594 bgcolor=#d6d6d6
| 328594 ||  || — || September 17, 2009 || Mount Lemmon || Mount Lemmon Survey || CHA || align=right | 2.1 km || 
|-id=595 bgcolor=#d6d6d6
| 328595 ||  || — || September 17, 2009 || Mount Lemmon || Mount Lemmon Survey || KOR || align=right | 1.2 km || 
|-id=596 bgcolor=#d6d6d6
| 328596 ||  || — || September 17, 2009 || Kitt Peak || Spacewatch || — || align=right | 3.7 km || 
|-id=597 bgcolor=#E9E9E9
| 328597 ||  || — || September 17, 2009 || Kitt Peak || Spacewatch || — || align=right | 2.1 km || 
|-id=598 bgcolor=#d6d6d6
| 328598 ||  || — || September 18, 2009 || Kitt Peak || Spacewatch || EOS || align=right | 1.6 km || 
|-id=599 bgcolor=#d6d6d6
| 328599 ||  || — || September 18, 2009 || Mount Lemmon || Mount Lemmon Survey || — || align=right | 3.0 km || 
|-id=600 bgcolor=#d6d6d6
| 328600 ||  || — || September 18, 2009 || Kitt Peak || Spacewatch || KOR || align=right | 1.5 km || 
|}

328601–328700 

|-bgcolor=#E9E9E9
| 328601 ||  || — || September 18, 2009 || Kitt Peak || Spacewatch || — || align=right | 2.4 km || 
|-id=602 bgcolor=#E9E9E9
| 328602 ||  || — || September 18, 2009 || Mount Lemmon || Mount Lemmon Survey || JUN || align=right | 1.5 km || 
|-id=603 bgcolor=#d6d6d6
| 328603 ||  || — || September 19, 2009 || Mount Lemmon || Mount Lemmon Survey || — || align=right | 2.8 km || 
|-id=604 bgcolor=#E9E9E9
| 328604 ||  || — || September 22, 2009 || Dauban || F. Kugel || AGN || align=right | 1.3 km || 
|-id=605 bgcolor=#d6d6d6
| 328605 ||  || — || September 20, 2009 || Calvin-Rehoboth || Calvin–Rehoboth Obs. || KOR || align=right | 1.5 km || 
|-id=606 bgcolor=#d6d6d6
| 328606 ||  || — || October 5, 2004 || Anderson Mesa || LONEOS || — || align=right | 3.6 km || 
|-id=607 bgcolor=#E9E9E9
| 328607 ||  || — || September 16, 2009 || Mount Lemmon || Mount Lemmon Survey || — || align=right | 1.9 km || 
|-id=608 bgcolor=#d6d6d6
| 328608 ||  || — || September 17, 2009 || Kitt Peak || Spacewatch || — || align=right | 3.8 km || 
|-id=609 bgcolor=#E9E9E9
| 328609 ||  || — || September 18, 2009 || Kitt Peak || Spacewatch || — || align=right | 2.0 km || 
|-id=610 bgcolor=#E9E9E9
| 328610 ||  || — || September 18, 2009 || Kitt Peak || Spacewatch || — || align=right | 4.1 km || 
|-id=611 bgcolor=#E9E9E9
| 328611 ||  || — || September 18, 2009 || Kitt Peak || Spacewatch || HOF || align=right | 2.4 km || 
|-id=612 bgcolor=#d6d6d6
| 328612 ||  || — || September 18, 2009 || Kitt Peak || Spacewatch || 628 || align=right | 2.1 km || 
|-id=613 bgcolor=#E9E9E9
| 328613 ||  || — || September 18, 2009 || Kitt Peak || Spacewatch || — || align=right | 1.6 km || 
|-id=614 bgcolor=#E9E9E9
| 328614 ||  || — || September 18, 2009 || Kitt Peak || Spacewatch || AGN || align=right | 1.2 km || 
|-id=615 bgcolor=#d6d6d6
| 328615 ||  || — || September 18, 2009 || Kitt Peak || Spacewatch || EOS || align=right | 5.3 km || 
|-id=616 bgcolor=#d6d6d6
| 328616 ||  || — || September 18, 2009 || Kitt Peak || Spacewatch || — || align=right | 3.3 km || 
|-id=617 bgcolor=#E9E9E9
| 328617 ||  || — || September 19, 2009 || Kitt Peak || Spacewatch || WIT || align=right | 1.2 km || 
|-id=618 bgcolor=#E9E9E9
| 328618 ||  || — || September 19, 2009 || Kitt Peak || Spacewatch || — || align=right | 2.9 km || 
|-id=619 bgcolor=#fefefe
| 328619 ||  || — || September 19, 2009 || Mount Lemmon || Mount Lemmon Survey || — || align=right data-sort-value="0.98" | 980 m || 
|-id=620 bgcolor=#E9E9E9
| 328620 ||  || — || September 19, 2009 || Mount Lemmon || Mount Lemmon Survey || HEN || align=right | 1.1 km || 
|-id=621 bgcolor=#d6d6d6
| 328621 ||  || — || September 19, 2009 || Kitt Peak || Spacewatch || — || align=right | 3.1 km || 
|-id=622 bgcolor=#E9E9E9
| 328622 ||  || — || May 19, 2004 || Siding Spring || SSS || — || align=right | 2.6 km || 
|-id=623 bgcolor=#E9E9E9
| 328623 ||  || — || September 20, 2009 || Kitt Peak || Spacewatch || — || align=right | 3.1 km || 
|-id=624 bgcolor=#E9E9E9
| 328624 ||  || — || October 29, 2005 || Kitt Peak || Spacewatch || — || align=right | 2.0 km || 
|-id=625 bgcolor=#fefefe
| 328625 ||  || — || October 1, 1998 || Kitt Peak || Spacewatch || — || align=right data-sort-value="0.71" | 710 m || 
|-id=626 bgcolor=#d6d6d6
| 328626 ||  || — || September 20, 2009 || Kitt Peak || Spacewatch || — || align=right | 3.9 km || 
|-id=627 bgcolor=#E9E9E9
| 328627 ||  || — || September 27, 2009 || Mayhill || A. Lowe || — || align=right | 2.7 km || 
|-id=628 bgcolor=#C2FFFF
| 328628 ||  || — || September 19, 2009 || Mount Lemmon || Mount Lemmon Survey || L4 || align=right | 9.9 km || 
|-id=629 bgcolor=#d6d6d6
| 328629 ||  || — || September 21, 2009 || Mount Lemmon || Mount Lemmon Survey || — || align=right | 2.3 km || 
|-id=630 bgcolor=#E9E9E9
| 328630 ||  || — || September 21, 2009 || Mount Lemmon || Mount Lemmon Survey || AGN || align=right | 1.2 km || 
|-id=631 bgcolor=#E9E9E9
| 328631 ||  || — || September 22, 2009 || Kitt Peak || Spacewatch || — || align=right | 1.8 km || 
|-id=632 bgcolor=#d6d6d6
| 328632 ||  || — || September 22, 2009 || Kitt Peak || Spacewatch || — || align=right | 2.7 km || 
|-id=633 bgcolor=#E9E9E9
| 328633 ||  || — || September 22, 2009 || Kitt Peak || Spacewatch || — || align=right | 2.0 km || 
|-id=634 bgcolor=#fefefe
| 328634 ||  || — || September 22, 2009 || Kitt Peak || Spacewatch || NYS || align=right data-sort-value="0.73" | 730 m || 
|-id=635 bgcolor=#E9E9E9
| 328635 ||  || — || September 22, 2009 || Kitt Peak || Spacewatch || EUN || align=right | 1.6 km || 
|-id=636 bgcolor=#E9E9E9
| 328636 ||  || — || September 23, 2009 || Kitt Peak || Spacewatch || EUN || align=right | 1.8 km || 
|-id=637 bgcolor=#E9E9E9
| 328637 ||  || — || September 23, 2009 || Kitt Peak || Spacewatch || — || align=right | 2.9 km || 
|-id=638 bgcolor=#d6d6d6
| 328638 ||  || — || September 23, 2009 || Kitt Peak || Spacewatch || — || align=right | 3.4 km || 
|-id=639 bgcolor=#E9E9E9
| 328639 ||  || — || September 23, 2009 || Kitt Peak || Spacewatch || HOF || align=right | 3.3 km || 
|-id=640 bgcolor=#d6d6d6
| 328640 ||  || — || September 23, 2009 || Kitt Peak || Spacewatch || — || align=right | 4.2 km || 
|-id=641 bgcolor=#fefefe
| 328641 ||  || — || September 23, 2009 || Črni Vrh || Črni Vrh || NYS || align=right data-sort-value="0.88" | 880 m || 
|-id=642 bgcolor=#E9E9E9
| 328642 ||  || — || September 24, 2009 || Kitt Peak || Spacewatch || HEN || align=right | 1.1 km || 
|-id=643 bgcolor=#d6d6d6
| 328643 ||  || — || February 4, 2006 || Kitt Peak || Spacewatch || — || align=right | 3.0 km || 
|-id=644 bgcolor=#E9E9E9
| 328644 ||  || — || September 24, 2009 || Mount Lemmon || Mount Lemmon Survey || HOF || align=right | 3.4 km || 
|-id=645 bgcolor=#d6d6d6
| 328645 ||  || — || September 19, 2009 || Kitt Peak || Spacewatch || — || align=right | 5.0 km || 
|-id=646 bgcolor=#fefefe
| 328646 ||  || — || September 23, 2009 || Kitt Peak || Spacewatch || NYS || align=right data-sort-value="0.77" | 770 m || 
|-id=647 bgcolor=#fefefe
| 328647 ||  || — || September 16, 2009 || Catalina || CSS || V || align=right data-sort-value="0.78" | 780 m || 
|-id=648 bgcolor=#d6d6d6
| 328648 ||  || — || November 2, 2004 || Anderson Mesa || LONEOS || — || align=right | 3.5 km || 
|-id=649 bgcolor=#d6d6d6
| 328649 ||  || — || September 16, 2009 || Catalina || CSS || — || align=right | 4.1 km || 
|-id=650 bgcolor=#fefefe
| 328650 ||  || — || September 16, 2009 || Catalina || CSS || — || align=right data-sort-value="0.96" | 960 m || 
|-id=651 bgcolor=#fefefe
| 328651 ||  || — || September 19, 2009 || Catalina || CSS || ERI || align=right | 2.5 km || 
|-id=652 bgcolor=#d6d6d6
| 328652 ||  || — || October 10, 2004 || Kitt Peak || Spacewatch || — || align=right | 4.1 km || 
|-id=653 bgcolor=#E9E9E9
| 328653 ||  || — || September 22, 2009 || Mount Lemmon || Mount Lemmon Survey || WIT || align=right | 1.1 km || 
|-id=654 bgcolor=#E9E9E9
| 328654 ||  || — || September 21, 2009 || Kitt Peak || Spacewatch || — || align=right | 1.4 km || 
|-id=655 bgcolor=#E9E9E9
| 328655 ||  || — || September 22, 2009 || Kitt Peak || Spacewatch || HOF || align=right | 3.1 km || 
|-id=656 bgcolor=#d6d6d6
| 328656 ||  || — || September 22, 2009 || Mount Lemmon || Mount Lemmon Survey || — || align=right | 3.5 km || 
|-id=657 bgcolor=#d6d6d6
| 328657 ||  || — || September 25, 2009 || Kitt Peak || Spacewatch || — || align=right | 5.5 km || 
|-id=658 bgcolor=#fefefe
| 328658 ||  || — || September 23, 2009 || Črni Vrh || Črni Vrh || — || align=right data-sort-value="0.98" | 980 m || 
|-id=659 bgcolor=#E9E9E9
| 328659 ||  || — || September 21, 2009 || Mount Lemmon || Mount Lemmon Survey || — || align=right | 2.2 km || 
|-id=660 bgcolor=#d6d6d6
| 328660 ||  || — || September 15, 2009 || Kitt Peak || Spacewatch || CHA || align=right | 2.2 km || 
|-id=661 bgcolor=#d6d6d6
| 328661 ||  || — || September 23, 2009 || Mount Lemmon || Mount Lemmon Survey || EOS || align=right | 2.8 km || 
|-id=662 bgcolor=#d6d6d6
| 328662 ||  || — || September 23, 2009 || Mount Lemmon || Mount Lemmon Survey || — || align=right | 4.3 km || 
|-id=663 bgcolor=#E9E9E9
| 328663 ||  || — || September 25, 2009 || Kitt Peak || Spacewatch || — || align=right | 2.6 km || 
|-id=664 bgcolor=#fefefe
| 328664 ||  || — || September 25, 2009 || Kitt Peak || Spacewatch || — || align=right data-sort-value="0.81" | 810 m || 
|-id=665 bgcolor=#fefefe
| 328665 ||  || — || September 25, 2009 || Kitt Peak || Spacewatch || MAS || align=right data-sort-value="0.59" | 590 m || 
|-id=666 bgcolor=#E9E9E9
| 328666 ||  || — || September 17, 2009 || Kitt Peak || Spacewatch || HOF || align=right | 3.2 km || 
|-id=667 bgcolor=#E9E9E9
| 328667 ||  || — || September 25, 2009 || Kitt Peak || Spacewatch || — || align=right | 1.3 km || 
|-id=668 bgcolor=#E9E9E9
| 328668 ||  || — || September 25, 2009 || Kitt Peak || Spacewatch || — || align=right | 2.1 km || 
|-id=669 bgcolor=#d6d6d6
| 328669 ||  || — || September 25, 2009 || Kitt Peak || Spacewatch || — || align=right | 3.0 km || 
|-id=670 bgcolor=#E9E9E9
| 328670 ||  || — || August 15, 2009 || Kitt Peak || Spacewatch || — || align=right | 2.0 km || 
|-id=671 bgcolor=#d6d6d6
| 328671 ||  || — || September 25, 2009 || Kitt Peak || Spacewatch || EOS || align=right | 2.0 km || 
|-id=672 bgcolor=#E9E9E9
| 328672 ||  || — || September 25, 2009 || Kitt Peak || Spacewatch || — || align=right | 2.4 km || 
|-id=673 bgcolor=#E9E9E9
| 328673 ||  || — || September 25, 2009 || Kitt Peak || Spacewatch || — || align=right | 2.6 km || 
|-id=674 bgcolor=#E9E9E9
| 328674 ||  || — || September 25, 2009 || Kitt Peak || Spacewatch || — || align=right | 2.5 km || 
|-id=675 bgcolor=#E9E9E9
| 328675 ||  || — || February 6, 2007 || Kitt Peak || Spacewatch || — || align=right | 1.6 km || 
|-id=676 bgcolor=#d6d6d6
| 328676 ||  || — || September 28, 2009 || Kitt Peak || Spacewatch || EOS || align=right | 2.7 km || 
|-id=677 bgcolor=#fefefe
| 328677 Stofan ||  ||  || September 18, 2009 || Anderson Mesa || L. H. Wasserman || — || align=right | 1.1 km || 
|-id=678 bgcolor=#fefefe
| 328678 ||  || — || December 14, 1995 || Kitt Peak || Spacewatch || FLO || align=right data-sort-value="0.79" | 790 m || 
|-id=679 bgcolor=#fefefe
| 328679 ||  || — || September 23, 2009 || Mount Lemmon || Mount Lemmon Survey || — || align=right | 1.1 km || 
|-id=680 bgcolor=#d6d6d6
| 328680 ||  || — || September 28, 2009 || Catalina || CSS || — || align=right | 4.4 km || 
|-id=681 bgcolor=#E9E9E9
| 328681 ||  || — || September 21, 2009 || Mount Lemmon || Mount Lemmon Survey || — || align=right | 1.8 km || 
|-id=682 bgcolor=#d6d6d6
| 328682 ||  || — || September 24, 2009 || Kitt Peak || Spacewatch || — || align=right | 3.5 km || 
|-id=683 bgcolor=#d6d6d6
| 328683 ||  || — || September 23, 2009 || Mount Lemmon || Mount Lemmon Survey || — || align=right | 3.9 km || 
|-id=684 bgcolor=#E9E9E9
| 328684 ||  || — || September 25, 2009 || Kitt Peak || Spacewatch || HOF || align=right | 2.8 km || 
|-id=685 bgcolor=#E9E9E9
| 328685 ||  || — || September 17, 2009 || Kitt Peak || Spacewatch || HOF || align=right | 2.8 km || 
|-id=686 bgcolor=#E9E9E9
| 328686 ||  || — || September 17, 2009 || Kitt Peak || Spacewatch || — || align=right data-sort-value="0.80" | 800 m || 
|-id=687 bgcolor=#E9E9E9
| 328687 ||  || — || September 18, 2009 || Kitt Peak || Spacewatch || — || align=right | 1.4 km || 
|-id=688 bgcolor=#d6d6d6
| 328688 ||  || — || September 18, 2009 || Kitt Peak || Spacewatch || 628 || align=right | 1.6 km || 
|-id=689 bgcolor=#E9E9E9
| 328689 ||  || — || September 28, 2009 || Mount Lemmon || Mount Lemmon Survey || AGN || align=right | 1.3 km || 
|-id=690 bgcolor=#d6d6d6
| 328690 ||  || — || September 21, 2009 || Catalina || CSS || — || align=right | 4.2 km || 
|-id=691 bgcolor=#d6d6d6
| 328691 ||  || — || September 18, 2009 || Catalina || CSS || TIR || align=right | 4.4 km || 
|-id=692 bgcolor=#d6d6d6
| 328692 ||  || — || March 15, 2007 || Mount Lemmon || Mount Lemmon Survey || — || align=right | 3.4 km || 
|-id=693 bgcolor=#d6d6d6
| 328693 ||  || — || September 20, 2009 || Kitt Peak || Spacewatch || — || align=right | 2.5 km || 
|-id=694 bgcolor=#d6d6d6
| 328694 ||  || — || September 19, 2009 || Mount Lemmon || Mount Lemmon Survey || KOR || align=right | 1.5 km || 
|-id=695 bgcolor=#d6d6d6
| 328695 ||  || — || September 20, 2009 || Mount Lemmon || Mount Lemmon Survey || — || align=right | 3.6 km || 
|-id=696 bgcolor=#E9E9E9
| 328696 ||  || — || September 21, 2009 || Mount Lemmon || Mount Lemmon Survey || — || align=right | 2.9 km || 
|-id=697 bgcolor=#d6d6d6
| 328697 ||  || — || September 17, 2009 || Kitt Peak || Spacewatch || — || align=right | 3.5 km || 
|-id=698 bgcolor=#E9E9E9
| 328698 ||  || — || September 29, 2009 || Kitt Peak || Spacewatch || — || align=right | 2.2 km || 
|-id=699 bgcolor=#d6d6d6
| 328699 ||  || — || September 19, 2009 || Kitt Peak || Spacewatch || THM || align=right | 2.5 km || 
|-id=700 bgcolor=#d6d6d6
| 328700 ||  || — || September 28, 2009 || Kitt Peak || Spacewatch || — || align=right | 2.8 km || 
|}

328701–328800 

|-bgcolor=#E9E9E9
| 328701 ||  || — || September 17, 2009 || Mount Lemmon || Mount Lemmon Survey || — || align=right | 2.6 km || 
|-id=702 bgcolor=#d6d6d6
| 328702 ||  || — || October 7, 2004 || Kitt Peak || Spacewatch || — || align=right | 3.0 km || 
|-id=703 bgcolor=#E9E9E9
| 328703 ||  || — || October 11, 2009 || La Sagra || OAM Obs. || — || align=right | 2.5 km || 
|-id=704 bgcolor=#E9E9E9
| 328704 ||  || — || October 12, 2009 || Tzec Maun || Tzec Maun Obs. || AGN || align=right | 1.3 km || 
|-id=705 bgcolor=#E9E9E9
| 328705 ||  || — || October 10, 2009 || La Sagra || OAM Obs. || — || align=right | 2.0 km || 
|-id=706 bgcolor=#E9E9E9
| 328706 ||  || — || October 12, 2009 || Mount Lemmon || Mount Lemmon Survey || ADE || align=right | 3.7 km || 
|-id=707 bgcolor=#d6d6d6
| 328707 ||  || — || October 12, 2009 || La Sagra || OAM Obs. || — || align=right | 3.1 km || 
|-id=708 bgcolor=#d6d6d6
| 328708 ||  || — || October 14, 2009 || Marly || P. Kocher || EOS || align=right | 2.3 km || 
|-id=709 bgcolor=#E9E9E9
| 328709 ||  || — || October 14, 2009 || Socorro || LINEAR || — || align=right | 2.2 km || 
|-id=710 bgcolor=#d6d6d6
| 328710 ||  || — || October 11, 2009 || La Sagra || OAM Obs. || ALA || align=right | 5.3 km || 
|-id=711 bgcolor=#E9E9E9
| 328711 ||  || — || October 10, 2009 || Bisei SG Center || BATTeRS || — || align=right | 2.2 km || 
|-id=712 bgcolor=#E9E9E9
| 328712 ||  || — || October 15, 2009 || Jarnac || Jarnac Obs. || GER || align=right | 1.8 km || 
|-id=713 bgcolor=#E9E9E9
| 328713 ||  || — || October 11, 2009 || La Sagra || OAM Obs. || — || align=right | 4.3 km || 
|-id=714 bgcolor=#E9E9E9
| 328714 ||  || — || October 15, 2009 || La Sagra || OAM Obs. || — || align=right | 2.2 km || 
|-id=715 bgcolor=#E9E9E9
| 328715 ||  || — || October 15, 2009 || La Sagra || OAM Obs. || — || align=right | 1.1 km || 
|-id=716 bgcolor=#E9E9E9
| 328716 ||  || — || October 15, 2009 || Catalina || CSS || EUN || align=right | 1.3 km || 
|-id=717 bgcolor=#E9E9E9
| 328717 ||  || — || October 15, 2009 || La Sagra || OAM Obs. || — || align=right | 3.1 km || 
|-id=718 bgcolor=#d6d6d6
| 328718 ||  || — || October 11, 2009 || Mount Lemmon || Mount Lemmon Survey || EOS || align=right | 2.3 km || 
|-id=719 bgcolor=#d6d6d6
| 328719 ||  || — || October 11, 2009 || La Sagra || OAM Obs. || — || align=right | 3.5 km || 
|-id=720 bgcolor=#E9E9E9
| 328720 ||  || — || October 11, 2009 || La Sagra || OAM Obs. || MAR || align=right | 1.2 km || 
|-id=721 bgcolor=#E9E9E9
| 328721 ||  || — || October 12, 2009 || La Sagra || OAM Obs. || — || align=right | 2.3 km || 
|-id=722 bgcolor=#fefefe
| 328722 ||  || — || October 14, 2009 || Purple Mountain || PMO NEO || ERI || align=right | 2.1 km || 
|-id=723 bgcolor=#E9E9E9
| 328723 ||  || — || October 9, 2009 || Catalina || CSS || — || align=right | 2.7 km || 
|-id=724 bgcolor=#d6d6d6
| 328724 ||  || — || February 2, 2006 || Kitt Peak || Spacewatch || — || align=right | 3.9 km || 
|-id=725 bgcolor=#E9E9E9
| 328725 ||  || — || October 14, 2009 || La Sagra || OAM Obs. || — || align=right | 2.4 km || 
|-id=726 bgcolor=#d6d6d6
| 328726 ||  || — || October 14, 2009 || Catalina || CSS || — || align=right | 3.4 km || 
|-id=727 bgcolor=#d6d6d6
| 328727 ||  || — || October 14, 2009 || Mount Lemmon || Mount Lemmon Survey || — || align=right | 4.3 km || 
|-id=728 bgcolor=#E9E9E9
| 328728 ||  || — || October 1, 2009 || Mount Lemmon || Mount Lemmon Survey || — || align=right | 2.8 km || 
|-id=729 bgcolor=#d6d6d6
| 328729 ||  || — || October 2, 2009 || Mount Lemmon || Mount Lemmon Survey || — || align=right | 3.7 km || 
|-id=730 bgcolor=#E9E9E9
| 328730 ||  || — || October 14, 2009 || La Sagra || OAM Obs. || — || align=right | 1.6 km || 
|-id=731 bgcolor=#d6d6d6
| 328731 ||  || — || October 14, 2009 || Mount Lemmon || Mount Lemmon Survey || ALA || align=right | 4.2 km || 
|-id=732 bgcolor=#C2FFFF
| 328732 ||  || — || April 8, 2002 || La Silla || C. Barbieri || L4 || align=right | 13 km || 
|-id=733 bgcolor=#E9E9E9
| 328733 ||  || — || October 15, 2009 || Mount Lemmon || Mount Lemmon Survey || — || align=right | 2.6 km || 
|-id=734 bgcolor=#FA8072
| 328734 ||  || — || October 17, 2009 || Tzec Maun || D. Chestnov, A. Novichonok || — || align=right | 1.1 km || 
|-id=735 bgcolor=#E9E9E9
| 328735 ||  || — || October 16, 2009 || Mount Lemmon || Mount Lemmon Survey || — || align=right | 2.3 km || 
|-id=736 bgcolor=#E9E9E9
| 328736 ||  || — || October 17, 2009 || La Sagra || OAM Obs. || — || align=right | 1.3 km || 
|-id=737 bgcolor=#E9E9E9
| 328737 ||  || — || October 24, 2009 || Mount Lemmon || Mount Lemmon Survey || — || align=right | 3.0 km || 
|-id=738 bgcolor=#d6d6d6
| 328738 ||  || — || October 18, 2009 || Mount Lemmon || Mount Lemmon Survey || — || align=right | 4.3 km || 
|-id=739 bgcolor=#d6d6d6
| 328739 ||  || — || October 21, 2009 || Catalina || CSS || 7:4 || align=right | 3.2 km || 
|-id=740 bgcolor=#d6d6d6
| 328740 ||  || — || October 18, 2009 || La Cañada || J. Lacruz || — || align=right | 4.1 km || 
|-id=741 bgcolor=#E9E9E9
| 328741 ||  || — || November 25, 2005 || Kitt Peak || Spacewatch || — || align=right | 1.6 km || 
|-id=742 bgcolor=#d6d6d6
| 328742 ||  || — || October 18, 2009 || Mount Lemmon || Mount Lemmon Survey || — || align=right | 3.1 km || 
|-id=743 bgcolor=#E9E9E9
| 328743 ||  || — || October 18, 2009 || Mount Lemmon || Mount Lemmon Survey || — || align=right | 1.5 km || 
|-id=744 bgcolor=#d6d6d6
| 328744 ||  || — || October 18, 2009 || Mount Lemmon || Mount Lemmon Survey || — || align=right | 3.7 km || 
|-id=745 bgcolor=#E9E9E9
| 328745 ||  || — || October 18, 2009 || Mount Lemmon || Mount Lemmon Survey || — || align=right | 2.6 km || 
|-id=746 bgcolor=#E9E9E9
| 328746 ||  || — || October 22, 2009 || Mount Lemmon || Mount Lemmon Survey || NEM || align=right | 2.6 km || 
|-id=747 bgcolor=#d6d6d6
| 328747 ||  || — || October 22, 2009 || Mount Lemmon || Mount Lemmon Survey || TRE || align=right | 2.2 km || 
|-id=748 bgcolor=#d6d6d6
| 328748 ||  || — || September 20, 2003 || Palomar || NEAT || EOS || align=right | 2.5 km || 
|-id=749 bgcolor=#d6d6d6
| 328749 ||  || — || October 23, 2009 || Mount Lemmon || Mount Lemmon Survey || — || align=right | 3.2 km || 
|-id=750 bgcolor=#d6d6d6
| 328750 ||  || — || October 23, 2009 || Mount Lemmon || Mount Lemmon Survey || — || align=right | 3.5 km || 
|-id=751 bgcolor=#d6d6d6
| 328751 ||  || — || October 17, 2009 || Mount Lemmon || Mount Lemmon Survey || HYG || align=right | 3.2 km || 
|-id=752 bgcolor=#d6d6d6
| 328752 ||  || — || September 29, 2009 || Kitt Peak || Spacewatch || EOS || align=right | 2.4 km || 
|-id=753 bgcolor=#d6d6d6
| 328753 ||  || — || October 17, 2009 || Mount Lemmon || Mount Lemmon Survey || — || align=right | 2.9 km || 
|-id=754 bgcolor=#d6d6d6
| 328754 ||  || — || October 17, 2009 || Mount Lemmon || Mount Lemmon Survey || EOS || align=right | 2.3 km || 
|-id=755 bgcolor=#E9E9E9
| 328755 ||  || — || October 22, 2009 || Mount Lemmon || Mount Lemmon Survey || — || align=right | 2.5 km || 
|-id=756 bgcolor=#E9E9E9
| 328756 ||  || — || October 21, 2009 || Mount Lemmon || Mount Lemmon Survey || — || align=right | 3.2 km || 
|-id=757 bgcolor=#d6d6d6
| 328757 ||  || — || October 19, 2009 || La Sagra || OAM Obs. || FIR || align=right | 3.9 km || 
|-id=758 bgcolor=#d6d6d6
| 328758 ||  || — || October 21, 2009 || Catalina || CSS || — || align=right | 6.1 km || 
|-id=759 bgcolor=#E9E9E9
| 328759 ||  || — || October 21, 2009 || Catalina || CSS || — || align=right | 1.8 km || 
|-id=760 bgcolor=#E9E9E9
| 328760 ||  || — || October 20, 2009 || Socorro || LINEAR || EUN || align=right | 2.1 km || 
|-id=761 bgcolor=#d6d6d6
| 328761 ||  || — || October 21, 2009 || Catalina || CSS || KOR || align=right | 1.6 km || 
|-id=762 bgcolor=#d6d6d6
| 328762 ||  || — || February 4, 2006 || Kitt Peak || Spacewatch || KOR || align=right | 1.6 km || 
|-id=763 bgcolor=#d6d6d6
| 328763 ||  || — || October 22, 2009 || Mount Lemmon || Mount Lemmon Survey || — || align=right | 2.3 km || 
|-id=764 bgcolor=#C2FFFF
| 328764 ||  || — || October 23, 2009 || Mount Lemmon || Mount Lemmon Survey || L4 || align=right | 11 km || 
|-id=765 bgcolor=#d6d6d6
| 328765 ||  || — || October 18, 1998 || Kitt Peak || Spacewatch || — || align=right | 2.7 km || 
|-id=766 bgcolor=#d6d6d6
| 328766 ||  || — || October 23, 2009 || Mount Lemmon || Mount Lemmon Survey || — || align=right | 5.9 km || 
|-id=767 bgcolor=#d6d6d6
| 328767 ||  || — || October 15, 2009 || La Sagra || OAM Obs. || EOS || align=right | 2.9 km || 
|-id=768 bgcolor=#d6d6d6
| 328768 ||  || — || October 22, 2009 || Mount Lemmon || Mount Lemmon Survey || — || align=right | 4.2 km || 
|-id=769 bgcolor=#E9E9E9
| 328769 ||  || — || August 9, 2004 || Anderson Mesa || LONEOS || — || align=right | 1.8 km || 
|-id=770 bgcolor=#d6d6d6
| 328770 ||  || — || October 23, 2009 || Kitt Peak || Spacewatch || SHU3:2 || align=right | 5.1 km || 
|-id=771 bgcolor=#d6d6d6
| 328771 ||  || — || October 23, 2009 || Kitt Peak || Spacewatch || — || align=right | 2.8 km || 
|-id=772 bgcolor=#d6d6d6
| 328772 ||  || — || October 23, 2009 || Mount Lemmon || Mount Lemmon Survey || EMA || align=right | 4.5 km || 
|-id=773 bgcolor=#E9E9E9
| 328773 ||  || — || October 21, 2009 || Mount Lemmon || Mount Lemmon Survey || — || align=right | 1.3 km || 
|-id=774 bgcolor=#E9E9E9
| 328774 ||  || — || October 23, 2009 || Mount Lemmon || Mount Lemmon Survey || — || align=right | 1.9 km || 
|-id=775 bgcolor=#E9E9E9
| 328775 ||  || — || October 29, 2009 || Bisei SG Center || BATTeRS || — || align=right | 3.3 km || 
|-id=776 bgcolor=#E9E9E9
| 328776 ||  || — || October 22, 2009 || Catalina || CSS || — || align=right | 1.2 km || 
|-id=777 bgcolor=#d6d6d6
| 328777 ||  || — || October 26, 2009 || Kitt Peak || Spacewatch || — || align=right | 3.7 km || 
|-id=778 bgcolor=#d6d6d6
| 328778 ||  || — || October 23, 2009 || Catalina || CSS || EUP || align=right | 6.3 km || 
|-id=779 bgcolor=#d6d6d6
| 328779 ||  || — || October 28, 2009 || La Sagra || OAM Obs. || — || align=right | 5.6 km || 
|-id=780 bgcolor=#d6d6d6
| 328780 ||  || — || October 16, 2009 || Catalina || CSS || URS || align=right | 4.7 km || 
|-id=781 bgcolor=#d6d6d6
| 328781 ||  || — || October 17, 2009 || Catalina || CSS || ELF || align=right | 5.4 km || 
|-id=782 bgcolor=#d6d6d6
| 328782 ||  || — || May 25, 2007 || Mount Lemmon || Mount Lemmon Survey || — || align=right | 3.5 km || 
|-id=783 bgcolor=#d6d6d6
| 328783 ||  || — || October 27, 2009 || Kitt Peak || Spacewatch || — || align=right | 2.4 km || 
|-id=784 bgcolor=#d6d6d6
| 328784 ||  || — || October 24, 2009 || Kitt Peak || Spacewatch || — || align=right | 3.3 km || 
|-id=785 bgcolor=#E9E9E9
| 328785 ||  || — || October 20, 2009 || Socorro || LINEAR || — || align=right | 2.0 km || 
|-id=786 bgcolor=#d6d6d6
| 328786 ||  || — || October 24, 2009 || Mount Lemmon || Mount Lemmon Survey || — || align=right | 3.9 km || 
|-id=787 bgcolor=#d6d6d6
| 328787 ||  || — || October 24, 2009 || Catalina || CSS || — || align=right | 4.1 km || 
|-id=788 bgcolor=#d6d6d6
| 328788 ||  || — || October 20, 2009 || Bisei SG Center || BATTeRS || — || align=right | 4.2 km || 
|-id=789 bgcolor=#d6d6d6
| 328789 ||  || — || October 29, 2009 || Bisei SG Center || BATTeRS || — || align=right | 3.5 km || 
|-id=790 bgcolor=#E9E9E9
| 328790 ||  || — || November 9, 2009 || Mayhill || iTelescope Obs. || EUN || align=right | 1.5 km || 
|-id=791 bgcolor=#d6d6d6
| 328791 ||  || — || November 10, 2009 || Tzec Maun || F. Tozzi || EOS || align=right | 3.2 km || 
|-id=792 bgcolor=#E9E9E9
| 328792 ||  || — || November 8, 2009 || Kitt Peak || Spacewatch || EUN || align=right | 1.7 km || 
|-id=793 bgcolor=#E9E9E9
| 328793 ||  || — || November 8, 2009 || Kitt Peak || Spacewatch || RAF || align=right data-sort-value="0.79" | 790 m || 
|-id=794 bgcolor=#d6d6d6
| 328794 ||  || — || November 8, 2009 || Mount Lemmon || Mount Lemmon Survey || — || align=right | 4.9 km || 
|-id=795 bgcolor=#d6d6d6
| 328795 ||  || — || November 8, 2009 || Catalina || CSS || HYG || align=right | 4.3 km || 
|-id=796 bgcolor=#d6d6d6
| 328796 ||  || — || November 8, 2009 || Catalina || CSS || HYG || align=right | 3.6 km || 
|-id=797 bgcolor=#d6d6d6
| 328797 ||  || — || November 9, 2009 || Mount Lemmon || Mount Lemmon Survey || EOS || align=right | 2.7 km || 
|-id=798 bgcolor=#d6d6d6
| 328798 ||  || — || November 8, 2009 || Kitt Peak || Spacewatch || — || align=right | 2.4 km || 
|-id=799 bgcolor=#d6d6d6
| 328799 ||  || — || September 18, 2009 || Mount Lemmon || Mount Lemmon Survey || — || align=right | 4.6 km || 
|-id=800 bgcolor=#d6d6d6
| 328800 ||  || — || November 9, 2009 || Kitt Peak || Spacewatch || EOS || align=right | 2.5 km || 
|}

328801–328900 

|-bgcolor=#d6d6d6
| 328801 ||  || — || November 9, 2009 || Mount Lemmon || Mount Lemmon Survey || — || align=right | 4.7 km || 
|-id=802 bgcolor=#d6d6d6
| 328802 ||  || — || November 9, 2009 || Kitt Peak || Spacewatch || URS || align=right | 5.8 km || 
|-id=803 bgcolor=#d6d6d6
| 328803 ||  || — || November 13, 2009 || Plana || F. Fratev || — || align=right | 3.2 km || 
|-id=804 bgcolor=#d6d6d6
| 328804 ||  || — || November 9, 2009 || Kitt Peak || Spacewatch || EUP || align=right | 5.7 km || 
|-id=805 bgcolor=#d6d6d6
| 328805 ||  || — || November 11, 2009 || Socorro || LINEAR || VER || align=right | 4.4 km || 
|-id=806 bgcolor=#d6d6d6
| 328806 ||  || — || November 8, 2009 || Kitt Peak || Spacewatch || — || align=right | 3.7 km || 
|-id=807 bgcolor=#d6d6d6
| 328807 ||  || — || October 12, 2009 || Mount Lemmon || Mount Lemmon Survey || — || align=right | 8.2 km || 
|-id=808 bgcolor=#E9E9E9
| 328808 ||  || — || November 12, 2009 || La Sagra || OAM Obs. || — || align=right | 2.6 km || 
|-id=809 bgcolor=#d6d6d6
| 328809 ||  || — || November 9, 2009 || Kitt Peak || Spacewatch || — || align=right | 3.9 km || 
|-id=810 bgcolor=#d6d6d6
| 328810 ||  || — || November 9, 2009 || Kitt Peak || Spacewatch || EOS || align=right | 2.3 km || 
|-id=811 bgcolor=#d6d6d6
| 328811 ||  || — || November 9, 2009 || Mount Lemmon || Mount Lemmon Survey || — || align=right | 3.1 km || 
|-id=812 bgcolor=#d6d6d6
| 328812 ||  || — || November 8, 2009 || Catalina || CSS || — || align=right | 5.4 km || 
|-id=813 bgcolor=#d6d6d6
| 328813 ||  || — || November 10, 2009 || Catalina || CSS || — || align=right | 3.7 km || 
|-id=814 bgcolor=#d6d6d6
| 328814 ||  || — || November 9, 2009 || Kitt Peak || Spacewatch || — || align=right | 4.8 km || 
|-id=815 bgcolor=#d6d6d6
| 328815 ||  || — || November 9, 2009 || Catalina || CSS || — || align=right | 5.7 km || 
|-id=816 bgcolor=#d6d6d6
| 328816 ||  || — || November 10, 2009 || Mount Lemmon || Mount Lemmon Survey || — || align=right | 3.5 km || 
|-id=817 bgcolor=#d6d6d6
| 328817 ||  || — || November 10, 2009 || Catalina || CSS || EOS || align=right | 2.4 km || 
|-id=818 bgcolor=#d6d6d6
| 328818 ||  || — || November 10, 2009 || Kitt Peak || Spacewatch || — || align=right | 3.9 km || 
|-id=819 bgcolor=#d6d6d6
| 328819 ||  || — || October 24, 2003 || Kitt Peak || M. W. Buie || — || align=right | 3.2 km || 
|-id=820 bgcolor=#d6d6d6
| 328820 ||  || — || November 8, 2009 || Catalina || CSS || — || align=right | 4.0 km || 
|-id=821 bgcolor=#d6d6d6
| 328821 ||  || — || November 8, 2009 || Catalina || CSS || HYG || align=right | 3.2 km || 
|-id=822 bgcolor=#d6d6d6
| 328822 ||  || — || November 9, 2009 || Mount Lemmon || Mount Lemmon Survey || — || align=right | 5.0 km || 
|-id=823 bgcolor=#d6d6d6
| 328823 ||  || — || November 15, 2009 || Catalina || CSS || — || align=right | 3.7 km || 
|-id=824 bgcolor=#d6d6d6
| 328824 ||  || — || November 14, 2009 || Socorro || LINEAR || FIR || align=right | 4.9 km || 
|-id=825 bgcolor=#E9E9E9
| 328825 ||  || — || November 15, 2009 || Socorro || LINEAR || ADE || align=right | 3.6 km || 
|-id=826 bgcolor=#E9E9E9
| 328826 ||  || — || March 26, 2003 || Palomar || NEAT || — || align=right | 1.8 km || 
|-id=827 bgcolor=#E9E9E9
| 328827 ||  || — || November 19, 2009 || Calvin-Rehoboth || L. A. Molnar || — || align=right | 3.0 km || 
|-id=828 bgcolor=#d6d6d6
| 328828 ||  || — || November 18, 2009 || Socorro || LINEAR || — || align=right | 3.5 km || 
|-id=829 bgcolor=#d6d6d6
| 328829 ||  || — || October 8, 2004 || Kitt Peak || Spacewatch || KOR || align=right | 1.5 km || 
|-id=830 bgcolor=#d6d6d6
| 328830 ||  || — || November 16, 2009 || Tzec Maun || Tzec Maun Obs. || — || align=right | 3.6 km || 
|-id=831 bgcolor=#d6d6d6
| 328831 ||  || — || November 22, 2009 || Catalina || CSS || Tj (2.98) || align=right | 4.9 km || 
|-id=832 bgcolor=#d6d6d6
| 328832 ||  || — || November 20, 2009 || Bergisch Gladbac || W. Bickel || TRE || align=right | 4.2 km || 
|-id=833 bgcolor=#d6d6d6
| 328833 ||  || — || November 16, 2009 || Kitt Peak || Spacewatch || — || align=right | 4.6 km || 
|-id=834 bgcolor=#E9E9E9
| 328834 ||  || — || November 17, 2009 || Catalina || CSS || — || align=right | 3.2 km || 
|-id=835 bgcolor=#d6d6d6
| 328835 ||  || — || November 18, 2009 || Kitt Peak || Spacewatch || URS || align=right | 3.1 km || 
|-id=836 bgcolor=#d6d6d6
| 328836 ||  || — || August 28, 2009 || Kitt Peak || Spacewatch || EOS || align=right | 2.2 km || 
|-id=837 bgcolor=#d6d6d6
| 328837 ||  || — || November 19, 2009 || Mount Lemmon || Mount Lemmon Survey || — || align=right | 3.9 km || 
|-id=838 bgcolor=#d6d6d6
| 328838 ||  || — || September 18, 2003 || Kitt Peak || Spacewatch || VER || align=right | 2.8 km || 
|-id=839 bgcolor=#d6d6d6
| 328839 ||  || — || November 16, 2009 || Kitt Peak || Spacewatch || HIL3:2 || align=right | 6.6 km || 
|-id=840 bgcolor=#d6d6d6
| 328840 ||  || — || November 18, 2009 || Kitt Peak || Spacewatch || — || align=right | 3.1 km || 
|-id=841 bgcolor=#d6d6d6
| 328841 ||  || — || November 18, 2009 || Kitt Peak || Spacewatch || 3:2 || align=right | 3.9 km || 
|-id=842 bgcolor=#d6d6d6
| 328842 ||  || — || October 30, 2009 || Mount Lemmon || Mount Lemmon Survey || — || align=right | 3.3 km || 
|-id=843 bgcolor=#E9E9E9
| 328843 ||  || — || November 18, 2009 || Kitt Peak || Spacewatch || — || align=right | 3.4 km || 
|-id=844 bgcolor=#d6d6d6
| 328844 ||  || — || November 18, 2009 || Kitt Peak || Spacewatch || CHA || align=right | 2.8 km || 
|-id=845 bgcolor=#d6d6d6
| 328845 ||  || — || November 19, 2009 || Kitt Peak || Spacewatch || VER || align=right | 2.8 km || 
|-id=846 bgcolor=#d6d6d6
| 328846 ||  || — || September 15, 2009 || Kitt Peak || Spacewatch || THM || align=right | 3.4 km || 
|-id=847 bgcolor=#d6d6d6
| 328847 ||  || — || November 20, 2009 || Kitt Peak || Spacewatch || — || align=right | 2.9 km || 
|-id=848 bgcolor=#d6d6d6
| 328848 ||  || — || October 15, 2004 || Mount Lemmon || Mount Lemmon Survey || KOR || align=right | 1.5 km || 
|-id=849 bgcolor=#d6d6d6
| 328849 ||  || — || November 21, 2009 || Kitt Peak || Spacewatch || — || align=right | 3.1 km || 
|-id=850 bgcolor=#d6d6d6
| 328850 ||  || — || March 5, 2006 || Kitt Peak || Spacewatch || HYG || align=right | 2.6 km || 
|-id=851 bgcolor=#d6d6d6
| 328851 ||  || — || November 20, 2009 || Kitt Peak || Spacewatch || — || align=right | 4.2 km || 
|-id=852 bgcolor=#d6d6d6
| 328852 ||  || — || March 31, 1995 || Kitt Peak || Spacewatch || — || align=right | 3.8 km || 
|-id=853 bgcolor=#d6d6d6
| 328853 ||  || — || November 19, 2009 || Mount Lemmon || Mount Lemmon Survey || — || align=right | 2.9 km || 
|-id=854 bgcolor=#d6d6d6
| 328854 ||  || — || November 19, 2009 || Catalina || CSS || VER || align=right | 3.9 km || 
|-id=855 bgcolor=#d6d6d6
| 328855 ||  || — || May 13, 2007 || Siding Spring || SSS || — || align=right | 3.8 km || 
|-id=856 bgcolor=#d6d6d6
| 328856 ||  || — || November 20, 2009 || Kitt Peak || Spacewatch || — || align=right | 4.6 km || 
|-id=857 bgcolor=#d6d6d6
| 328857 ||  || — || November 21, 2009 || Kitt Peak || Spacewatch || EMA || align=right | 4.6 km || 
|-id=858 bgcolor=#d6d6d6
| 328858 ||  || — || March 13, 2007 || Mount Lemmon || Mount Lemmon Survey || TRE || align=right | 2.4 km || 
|-id=859 bgcolor=#d6d6d6
| 328859 ||  || — || October 2, 2003 || Kitt Peak || Spacewatch || EOS || align=right | 2.3 km || 
|-id=860 bgcolor=#d6d6d6
| 328860 ||  || — || November 24, 2009 || Kitt Peak || Spacewatch || — || align=right | 4.1 km || 
|-id=861 bgcolor=#d6d6d6
| 328861 ||  || — || November 17, 2009 || Catalina || CSS || HYG || align=right | 3.4 km || 
|-id=862 bgcolor=#d6d6d6
| 328862 ||  || — || November 17, 2009 || Catalina || CSS || — || align=right | 4.3 km || 
|-id=863 bgcolor=#E9E9E9
| 328863 ||  || — || October 13, 2004 || Kitt Peak || Spacewatch || — || align=right | 2.1 km || 
|-id=864 bgcolor=#d6d6d6
| 328864 ||  || — || November 17, 2009 || Mount Lemmon || Mount Lemmon Survey || EMA || align=right | 5.9 km || 
|-id=865 bgcolor=#C2FFFF
| 328865 ||  || — || September 20, 2009 || Mount Lemmon || Mount Lemmon Survey || L4 || align=right | 9.9 km || 
|-id=866 bgcolor=#d6d6d6
| 328866 ||  || — || November 19, 2009 || Mount Lemmon || Mount Lemmon Survey || — || align=right | 4.4 km || 
|-id=867 bgcolor=#E9E9E9
| 328867 ||  || — || November 17, 2009 || Mount Lemmon || Mount Lemmon Survey || — || align=right | 2.9 km || 
|-id=868 bgcolor=#E9E9E9
| 328868 ||  || — || December 7, 2005 || Catalina || CSS || — || align=right | 1.4 km || 
|-id=869 bgcolor=#d6d6d6
| 328869 ||  || — || November 18, 2003 || Kitt Peak || Spacewatch || — || align=right | 5.7 km || 
|-id=870 bgcolor=#d6d6d6
| 328870 Danabarbato ||  ||  || December 11, 2009 || Nogales || Tenagra II Obs. || — || align=right | 4.0 km || 
|-id=871 bgcolor=#d6d6d6
| 328871 ||  || — || October 20, 2009 || Siding Spring || SSS || Tj (2.98) || align=right | 6.9 km || 
|-id=872 bgcolor=#d6d6d6
| 328872 ||  || — || January 8, 2010 || WISE || WISE || URS || align=right | 4.1 km || 
|-id=873 bgcolor=#d6d6d6
| 328873 ||  || — || October 14, 2009 || Catalina || CSS || THM || align=right | 2.7 km || 
|-id=874 bgcolor=#d6d6d6
| 328874 ||  || — || January 22, 2006 || Mount Lemmon || Mount Lemmon Survey || — || align=right | 3.6 km || 
|-id=875 bgcolor=#d6d6d6
| 328875 ||  || — || February 2, 2006 || Mount Lemmon || Mount Lemmon Survey || — || align=right | 5.3 km || 
|-id=876 bgcolor=#E9E9E9
| 328876 ||  || — || July 27, 2004 || Siding Spring || SSS || — || align=right | 1.9 km || 
|-id=877 bgcolor=#C2FFFF
| 328877 ||  || — || September 13, 2007 || Mount Lemmon || Mount Lemmon Survey || L4 || align=right | 12 km || 
|-id=878 bgcolor=#C2FFFF
| 328878 ||  || — || April 26, 2003 || Kitt Peak || Spacewatch || L4 || align=right | 11 km || 
|-id=879 bgcolor=#d6d6d6
| 328879 ||  || — || January 19, 2005 || Kitt Peak || Spacewatch || LUT || align=right | 4.9 km || 
|-id=880 bgcolor=#d6d6d6
| 328880 ||  || — || February 8, 2010 || WISE || WISE || — || align=right | 4.6 km || 
|-id=881 bgcolor=#d6d6d6
| 328881 ||  || — || September 28, 2008 || Mount Lemmon || Mount Lemmon Survey || HIL3:2 || align=right | 5.5 km || 
|-id=882 bgcolor=#d6d6d6
| 328882 ||  || — || March 2, 2010 || WISE || WISE || — || align=right | 4.6 km || 
|-id=883 bgcolor=#C2FFFF
| 328883 ||  || — || April 16, 2010 || WISE || WISE || L5 || align=right | 16 km || 
|-id=884 bgcolor=#C7FF8F
| 328884 ||  || — || February 17, 2010 || Mount Lemmon || Mount Lemmon Survey || centaurcritical || align=right | 44 km || 
|-id=885 bgcolor=#E9E9E9
| 328885 ||  || — || July 7, 2010 || WISE || WISE || — || align=right | 2.8 km || 
|-id=886 bgcolor=#E9E9E9
| 328886 ||  || — || July 21, 2010 || WISE || WISE || — || align=right | 4.0 km || 
|-id=887 bgcolor=#d6d6d6
| 328887 ||  || — || March 10, 2007 || Palomar || NEAT || ALA || align=right | 5.5 km || 
|-id=888 bgcolor=#E9E9E9
| 328888 ||  || — || October 23, 2006 || Siding Spring || SSS || — || align=right | 3.0 km || 
|-id=889 bgcolor=#fefefe
| 328889 ||  || — || February 19, 2009 || Catalina || CSS || H || align=right data-sort-value="0.94" | 940 m || 
|-id=890 bgcolor=#fefefe
| 328890 ||  || — || September 2, 2010 || Mount Lemmon || Mount Lemmon Survey || FLO || align=right data-sort-value="0.66" | 660 m || 
|-id=891 bgcolor=#fefefe
| 328891 ||  || — || September 5, 2010 || Bergisch Gladbac || W. Bickel || H || align=right data-sort-value="0.52" | 520 m || 
|-id=892 bgcolor=#fefefe
| 328892 ||  || — || September 2, 2010 || Mount Lemmon || Mount Lemmon Survey || V || align=right data-sort-value="0.74" | 740 m || 
|-id=893 bgcolor=#fefefe
| 328893 ||  || — || September 28, 2006 || Mount Lemmon || Mount Lemmon Survey || NYS || align=right data-sort-value="0.64" | 640 m || 
|-id=894 bgcolor=#fefefe
| 328894 ||  || — || November 11, 2007 || Mount Lemmon || Mount Lemmon Survey || — || align=right data-sort-value="0.73" | 730 m || 
|-id=895 bgcolor=#fefefe
| 328895 ||  || — || March 21, 2001 || Anderson Mesa || LONEOS || — || align=right | 1.7 km || 
|-id=896 bgcolor=#fefefe
| 328896 ||  || — || November 29, 2003 || Kitt Peak || Spacewatch || NYS || align=right data-sort-value="0.56" | 560 m || 
|-id=897 bgcolor=#fefefe
| 328897 ||  || — || September 17, 1995 || Kitt Peak || Spacewatch || MAS || align=right data-sort-value="0.73" | 730 m || 
|-id=898 bgcolor=#fefefe
| 328898 ||  || — || October 23, 2003 || Haleakala || NEAT || — || align=right data-sort-value="0.84" | 840 m || 
|-id=899 bgcolor=#fefefe
| 328899 ||  || — || July 25, 2007 || Siding Spring || SSS || H || align=right data-sort-value="0.65" | 650 m || 
|-id=900 bgcolor=#fefefe
| 328900 ||  || — || October 18, 2007 || Kitt Peak || Spacewatch || — || align=right data-sort-value="0.68" | 680 m || 
|}

328901–329000 

|-bgcolor=#fefefe
| 328901 ||  || — || March 9, 2005 || Kitt Peak || Spacewatch || — || align=right data-sort-value="0.92" | 920 m || 
|-id=902 bgcolor=#fefefe
| 328902 ||  || — || October 16, 2006 || Mount Lemmon || Mount Lemmon Survey || — || align=right | 1.4 km || 
|-id=903 bgcolor=#fefefe
| 328903 ||  || — || November 3, 2007 || Kitt Peak || Spacewatch || — || align=right data-sort-value="0.70" | 700 m || 
|-id=904 bgcolor=#fefefe
| 328904 ||  || — || February 13, 2002 || Palomar || NEAT || — || align=right data-sort-value="0.71" | 710 m || 
|-id=905 bgcolor=#E9E9E9
| 328905 ||  || — || October 3, 2006 || Mount Lemmon || Mount Lemmon Survey || — || align=right data-sort-value="0.77" | 770 m || 
|-id=906 bgcolor=#E9E9E9
| 328906 ||  || — || March 8, 2003 || Socorro || LINEAR || JUN || align=right | 1.3 km || 
|-id=907 bgcolor=#E9E9E9
| 328907 ||  || — || October 21, 2006 || Mount Lemmon || Mount Lemmon Survey || — || align=right | 1.7 km || 
|-id=908 bgcolor=#fefefe
| 328908 ||  || — || November 9, 2007 || Kitt Peak || Spacewatch || — || align=right data-sort-value="0.80" | 800 m || 
|-id=909 bgcolor=#E9E9E9
| 328909 ||  || — || December 17, 2006 || Catalina || CSS || JUN || align=right | 1.2 km || 
|-id=910 bgcolor=#fefefe
| 328910 ||  || — || February 11, 2004 || Kitt Peak || Spacewatch || — || align=right data-sort-value="0.91" | 910 m || 
|-id=911 bgcolor=#fefefe
| 328911 ||  || — || September 15, 2006 || Kitt Peak || Spacewatch || MAS || align=right data-sort-value="0.75" | 750 m || 
|-id=912 bgcolor=#E9E9E9
| 328912 ||  || — || October 14, 2001 || Desert Eagle || W. K. Y. Yeung || — || align=right | 2.8 km || 
|-id=913 bgcolor=#E9E9E9
| 328913 ||  || — || October 21, 2006 || Mount Lemmon || Mount Lemmon Survey || — || align=right data-sort-value="0.90" | 900 m || 
|-id=914 bgcolor=#E9E9E9
| 328914 ||  || — || December 12, 2006 || Palomar || NEAT || — || align=right | 1.6 km || 
|-id=915 bgcolor=#E9E9E9
| 328915 ||  || — || March 28, 2008 || Mount Lemmon || Mount Lemmon Survey || — || align=right | 3.0 km || 
|-id=916 bgcolor=#fefefe
| 328916 ||  || — || August 23, 2003 || Palomar || NEAT || — || align=right data-sort-value="0.77" | 770 m || 
|-id=917 bgcolor=#E9E9E9
| 328917 ||  || — || December 1, 2006 || Mount Lemmon || Mount Lemmon Survey || — || align=right | 2.5 km || 
|-id=918 bgcolor=#fefefe
| 328918 ||  || — || November 18, 2003 || Kitt Peak || Spacewatch || V || align=right data-sort-value="0.55" | 550 m || 
|-id=919 bgcolor=#fefefe
| 328919 ||  || — || January 26, 1996 || Kitt Peak || Spacewatch || NYS || align=right data-sort-value="0.63" | 630 m || 
|-id=920 bgcolor=#E9E9E9
| 328920 ||  || — || February 7, 2007 || Mount Lemmon || Mount Lemmon Survey || INO || align=right | 1.3 km || 
|-id=921 bgcolor=#fefefe
| 328921 ||  || — || August 21, 2006 || Kitt Peak || Spacewatch || NYS || align=right data-sort-value="0.76" | 760 m || 
|-id=922 bgcolor=#E9E9E9
| 328922 ||  || — || February 9, 2003 || Haleakala || NEAT || — || align=right | 1.7 km || 
|-id=923 bgcolor=#fefefe
| 328923 ||  || — || December 11, 2004 || Kitt Peak || Spacewatch || — || align=right data-sort-value="0.75" | 750 m || 
|-id=924 bgcolor=#E9E9E9
| 328924 ||  || — || April 6, 2003 || Kitt Peak || Spacewatch || MRX || align=right | 1.0 km || 
|-id=925 bgcolor=#fefefe
| 328925 ||  || — || September 23, 2000 || Anderson Mesa || LONEOS || — || align=right data-sort-value="0.81" | 810 m || 
|-id=926 bgcolor=#E9E9E9
| 328926 ||  || — || March 1, 2008 || Kitt Peak || Spacewatch || MAR || align=right | 1.3 km || 
|-id=927 bgcolor=#E9E9E9
| 328927 ||  || — || January 27, 2003 || Palomar || NEAT || — || align=right | 1.8 km || 
|-id=928 bgcolor=#d6d6d6
| 328928 ||  || — || March 16, 2007 || Kitt Peak || Spacewatch || — || align=right | 3.9 km || 
|-id=929 bgcolor=#fefefe
| 328929 ||  || — || April 17, 2001 || Anderson Mesa || LONEOS || H || align=right data-sort-value="0.82" | 820 m || 
|-id=930 bgcolor=#fefefe
| 328930 ||  || — || February 16, 2004 || Kitt Peak || Spacewatch || V || align=right data-sort-value="0.69" | 690 m || 
|-id=931 bgcolor=#E9E9E9
| 328931 ||  || — || January 11, 2003 || Kitt Peak || Spacewatch || — || align=right | 1.1 km || 
|-id=932 bgcolor=#fefefe
| 328932 ||  || — || April 8, 2002 || Palomar || NEAT || FLO || align=right data-sort-value="0.83" | 830 m || 
|-id=933 bgcolor=#fefefe
| 328933 ||  || — || January 5, 2000 || Socorro || LINEAR || — || align=right | 1.0 km || 
|-id=934 bgcolor=#d6d6d6
| 328934 ||  || — || March 10, 2007 || Mount Lemmon || Mount Lemmon Survey || — || align=right | 2.4 km || 
|-id=935 bgcolor=#E9E9E9
| 328935 ||  || — || March 10, 2003 || Palomar || NEAT || MIS || align=right | 2.5 km || 
|-id=936 bgcolor=#fefefe
| 328936 ||  || — || March 23, 1995 || Kitt Peak || Spacewatch || — || align=right data-sort-value="0.94" | 940 m || 
|-id=937 bgcolor=#E9E9E9
| 328937 ||  || — || August 31, 2005 || Kitt Peak || Spacewatch || — || align=right | 2.4 km || 
|-id=938 bgcolor=#fefefe
| 328938 ||  || — || December 19, 2003 || Socorro || LINEAR || — || align=right | 1.1 km || 
|-id=939 bgcolor=#E9E9E9
| 328939 ||  || — || November 4, 2010 || La Sagra || OAM Obs. || — || align=right | 2.4 km || 
|-id=940 bgcolor=#E9E9E9
| 328940 ||  || — || September 28, 2006 || Mount Lemmon || Mount Lemmon Survey || — || align=right | 1.2 km || 
|-id=941 bgcolor=#E9E9E9
| 328941 ||  || — || September 14, 2005 || Kitt Peak || Spacewatch || — || align=right | 1.7 km || 
|-id=942 bgcolor=#fefefe
| 328942 ||  || — || September 20, 2003 || Kitt Peak || Spacewatch || — || align=right data-sort-value="0.83" | 830 m || 
|-id=943 bgcolor=#E9E9E9
| 328943 ||  || — || October 6, 2010 || La Sagra || OAM Obs. || — || align=right | 2.1 km || 
|-id=944 bgcolor=#d6d6d6
| 328944 ||  || — || October 8, 2004 || Kitt Peak || Spacewatch || HYG || align=right | 2.3 km || 
|-id=945 bgcolor=#fefefe
| 328945 ||  || — || August 29, 2006 || Catalina || CSS || FLO || align=right data-sort-value="0.74" | 740 m || 
|-id=946 bgcolor=#E9E9E9
| 328946 ||  || — || October 10, 2001 || Palomar || NEAT || ADE || align=right | 2.4 km || 
|-id=947 bgcolor=#E9E9E9
| 328947 ||  || — || September 18, 2001 || Anderson Mesa || LONEOS || — || align=right | 1.6 km || 
|-id=948 bgcolor=#fefefe
| 328948 ||  || — || September 20, 2003 || Palomar || NEAT || — || align=right data-sort-value="0.99" | 990 m || 
|-id=949 bgcolor=#fefefe
| 328949 ||  || — || April 10, 2002 || Socorro || LINEAR || FLO || align=right data-sort-value="0.84" | 840 m || 
|-id=950 bgcolor=#fefefe
| 328950 ||  || — || January 17, 2004 || Palomar || NEAT || — || align=right | 1.1 km || 
|-id=951 bgcolor=#fefefe
| 328951 ||  || — || November 11, 2007 || Mount Lemmon || Mount Lemmon Survey || — || align=right data-sort-value="0.76" | 760 m || 
|-id=952 bgcolor=#fefefe
| 328952 ||  || — || January 16, 2004 || Kitt Peak || Spacewatch || — || align=right data-sort-value="0.72" | 720 m || 
|-id=953 bgcolor=#E9E9E9
| 328953 ||  || — || May 11, 2008 || Kitt Peak || Spacewatch || — || align=right | 1.6 km || 
|-id=954 bgcolor=#E9E9E9
| 328954 ||  || — || November 11, 2006 || Kitt Peak || Spacewatch || RAF || align=right | 1.1 km || 
|-id=955 bgcolor=#fefefe
| 328955 ||  || — || December 16, 2007 || Kitt Peak || Spacewatch || ERI || align=right | 1.9 km || 
|-id=956 bgcolor=#E9E9E9
| 328956 ||  || — || November 19, 2001 || Socorro || LINEAR || MRX || align=right | 1.3 km || 
|-id=957 bgcolor=#fefefe
| 328957 ||  || — || November 9, 2007 || Kitt Peak || Spacewatch || — || align=right data-sort-value="0.89" | 890 m || 
|-id=958 bgcolor=#fefefe
| 328958 ||  || — || March 3, 2005 || Catalina || CSS || — || align=right data-sort-value="0.80" | 800 m || 
|-id=959 bgcolor=#fefefe
| 328959 ||  || — || November 19, 2003 || Kitt Peak || Spacewatch || — || align=right data-sort-value="0.93" | 930 m || 
|-id=960 bgcolor=#fefefe
| 328960 ||  || — || May 16, 2005 || Mount Lemmon || Mount Lemmon Survey || — || align=right data-sort-value="0.99" | 990 m || 
|-id=961 bgcolor=#fefefe
| 328961 ||  || — || September 18, 2003 || Kitt Peak || Spacewatch || FLO || align=right data-sort-value="0.67" | 670 m || 
|-id=962 bgcolor=#E9E9E9
| 328962 ||  || — || January 23, 2007 || Anderson Mesa || LONEOS || JUN || align=right | 1.1 km || 
|-id=963 bgcolor=#fefefe
| 328963 ||  || — || April 5, 2002 || Palomar || NEAT || — || align=right data-sort-value="0.91" | 910 m || 
|-id=964 bgcolor=#E9E9E9
| 328964 ||  || — || December 23, 2006 || Mount Lemmon || Mount Lemmon Survey || — || align=right | 1.2 km || 
|-id=965 bgcolor=#E9E9E9
| 328965 ||  || — || February 17, 1999 || Socorro || LINEAR || EUN || align=right | 1.5 km || 
|-id=966 bgcolor=#fefefe
| 328966 ||  || — || February 8, 2008 || Kitt Peak || Spacewatch || NYS || align=right data-sort-value="0.65" | 650 m || 
|-id=967 bgcolor=#E9E9E9
| 328967 ||  || — || April 6, 2008 || Kitt Peak || Spacewatch || — || align=right | 2.0 km || 
|-id=968 bgcolor=#fefefe
| 328968 ||  || — || February 10, 2004 || Palomar || NEAT || FLO || align=right data-sort-value="0.81" | 810 m || 
|-id=969 bgcolor=#FA8072
| 328969 ||  || — || December 18, 2004 || Mount Lemmon || Mount Lemmon Survey || — || align=right data-sort-value="0.84" | 840 m || 
|-id=970 bgcolor=#fefefe
| 328970 ||  || — || March 9, 2008 || Socorro || LINEAR || — || align=right data-sort-value="0.98" | 980 m || 
|-id=971 bgcolor=#E9E9E9
| 328971 ||  || — || February 8, 2003 || Haleakala || NEAT || — || align=right | 1.6 km || 
|-id=972 bgcolor=#fefefe
| 328972 ||  || — || March 10, 2005 || Kitt Peak || Spacewatch || — || align=right data-sort-value="0.85" | 850 m || 
|-id=973 bgcolor=#E9E9E9
| 328973 ||  || — || November 11, 2006 || Kitt Peak || Spacewatch || — || align=right data-sort-value="0.97" | 970 m || 
|-id=974 bgcolor=#E9E9E9
| 328974 ||  || — || September 19, 2001 || Socorro || LINEAR || — || align=right | 1.6 km || 
|-id=975 bgcolor=#fefefe
| 328975 ||  || — || September 26, 2000 || Socorro || LINEAR || — || align=right data-sort-value="0.83" | 830 m || 
|-id=976 bgcolor=#d6d6d6
| 328976 ||  || — || September 13, 2004 || Kitt Peak || Spacewatch || EOS || align=right | 2.0 km || 
|-id=977 bgcolor=#E9E9E9
| 328977 ||  || — || October 23, 2006 || Mount Lemmon || Mount Lemmon Survey || — || align=right | 1.5 km || 
|-id=978 bgcolor=#E9E9E9
| 328978 ||  || — || March 9, 2003 || Palomar || NEAT || EUN || align=right | 1.7 km || 
|-id=979 bgcolor=#FA8072
| 328979 ||  || — || May 5, 2006 || Kitt Peak || Spacewatch || — || align=right data-sort-value="0.88" | 880 m || 
|-id=980 bgcolor=#d6d6d6
| 328980 ||  || — || November 7, 2010 || Catalina || CSS || EUP || align=right | 4.6 km || 
|-id=981 bgcolor=#fefefe
| 328981 ||  || — || February 13, 2004 || Anderson Mesa || LONEOS || — || align=right data-sort-value="0.93" | 930 m || 
|-id=982 bgcolor=#d6d6d6
| 328982 ||  || — || March 9, 2007 || Mount Lemmon || Mount Lemmon Survey || EOS || align=right | 1.9 km || 
|-id=983 bgcolor=#E9E9E9
| 328983 ||  || — || July 8, 2005 || Kitt Peak || Spacewatch || — || align=right | 1.3 km || 
|-id=984 bgcolor=#E9E9E9
| 328984 ||  || — || May 6, 2008 || Kitt Peak || Spacewatch || EUN || align=right | 1.3 km || 
|-id=985 bgcolor=#fefefe
| 328985 ||  || — || November 24, 2006 || Mount Lemmon || Mount Lemmon Survey || — || align=right data-sort-value="0.84" | 840 m || 
|-id=986 bgcolor=#fefefe
| 328986 ||  || — || July 25, 2006 || Palomar || NEAT || FLO || align=right data-sort-value="0.74" | 740 m || 
|-id=987 bgcolor=#E9E9E9
| 328987 ||  || — || November 22, 2006 || Kitt Peak || Spacewatch || — || align=right | 1.2 km || 
|-id=988 bgcolor=#fefefe
| 328988 ||  || — || May 18, 2002 || Palomar || NEAT || — || align=right data-sort-value="0.91" | 910 m || 
|-id=989 bgcolor=#E9E9E9
| 328989 ||  || — || October 22, 2006 || Mount Lemmon || Mount Lemmon Survey || — || align=right | 1.1 km || 
|-id=990 bgcolor=#E9E9E9
| 328990 ||  || — || April 3, 2008 || Kitt Peak || Spacewatch || — || align=right | 1.5 km || 
|-id=991 bgcolor=#E9E9E9
| 328991 ||  || — || November 17, 2006 || Kitt Peak || Spacewatch || — || align=right | 1.0 km || 
|-id=992 bgcolor=#d6d6d6
| 328992 ||  || — || November 10, 1999 || Kitt Peak || Spacewatch || — || align=right | 3.4 km || 
|-id=993 bgcolor=#E9E9E9
| 328993 ||  || — || March 29, 2008 || Kitt Peak || Spacewatch || — || align=right | 1.2 km || 
|-id=994 bgcolor=#E9E9E9
| 328994 ||  || — || November 19, 2006 || Kitt Peak || Spacewatch || — || align=right | 1.2 km || 
|-id=995 bgcolor=#d6d6d6
| 328995 ||  || — || November 10, 2004 || Kitt Peak || Spacewatch || — || align=right | 4.0 km || 
|-id=996 bgcolor=#E9E9E9
| 328996 ||  || — || August 18, 2009 || Kitt Peak || Spacewatch || — || align=right | 2.1 km || 
|-id=997 bgcolor=#E9E9E9
| 328997 ||  || — || January 27, 2003 || Socorro || LINEAR || — || align=right | 1.4 km || 
|-id=998 bgcolor=#fefefe
| 328998 ||  || — || November 1, 2006 || Mount Lemmon || Mount Lemmon Survey || — || align=right data-sort-value="0.89" | 890 m || 
|-id=999 bgcolor=#d6d6d6
| 328999 ||  || — || December 15, 2004 || Kitt Peak || Spacewatch || HYG || align=right | 3.2 km || 
|-id=000 bgcolor=#d6d6d6
| 329000 ||  || — || December 26, 2005 || Kitt Peak || Spacewatch || — || align=right | 3.4 km || 
|}

References

External links 
 Discovery Circumstances: Numbered Minor Planets (325001)–(330000) (IAU Minor Planet Center)

0328